= Invasion of Buna–Gona =

1942 WWII Japanese victory on New Guinea

Coordinates: 8°39′S 148°22′E

- Part of the Pacific Theatre of the Second World War
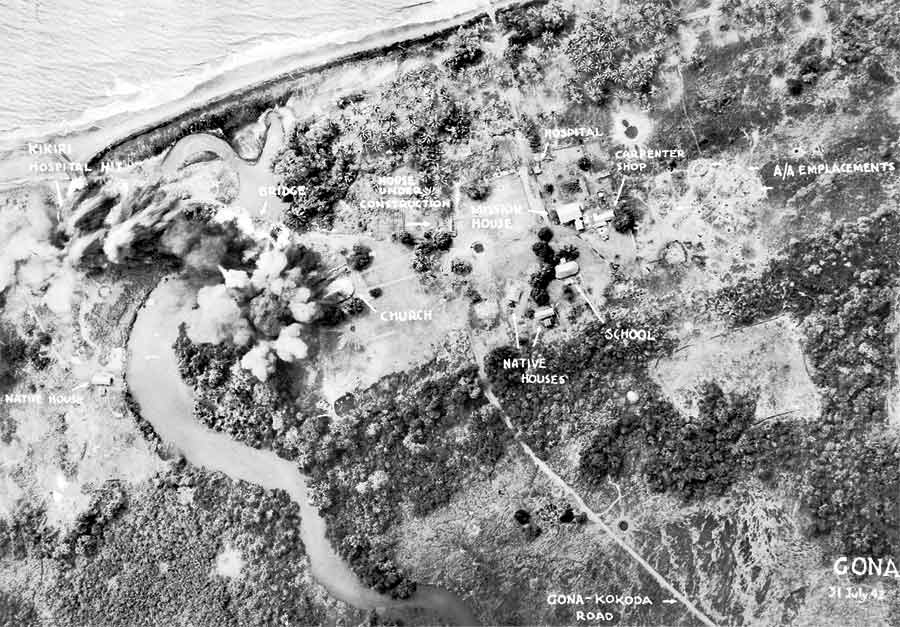
- Aerial reconnaissance photo of Gona shortly after the Japanese landings. (AWM128399) (Note: Australian War Memorial (AWM) collection reference number.)
Date	21–27 July 1942
Location	Buna–Gona area, Oro Province, Territory of Papua
Result	Japanese victory

Belligerents
Australia; United States	Japan

Commanders and leaders
(Australia) Basil Morris	(Empire of Japan) Harukichi Hyakutake

Strength
~ 100	4,057

Casualties and losses
6 killed	1 transport ship sunk 1 transport ship damaged 1 destroyer damaged

The invasion of Buna–Gona, called Operation RI by the Japanese, was a military operation by Imperial Japanese forces to occupy the Buna–Gona area in the Territory of Papua during the Pacific campaign of the Second World War. The initial landings and advance on Kokoda occurred between 21 and 27 July 1942. The Japanese invaded and occupied the location in preparation for an overland attack on Port Moresby along the Kokoda Track. The landing marked the start of the Kokoda Track campaign. The landings were not directly opposed by land forces but were engaged by elements of Maroubra Force as they advanced on Kokoda. This initially included B Company of the 39th Battalion, patrols of the Papuan Infantry Battalion (PIB) operating in the area and a small number of the Australian New Guinea Administrative Unit (ANGAU) that became attached to the force. The Australians were initially repulsed near Oivi but subsequently regrouped to defend Kokoda in an initial battle there from 28–29 July.

== Background ==
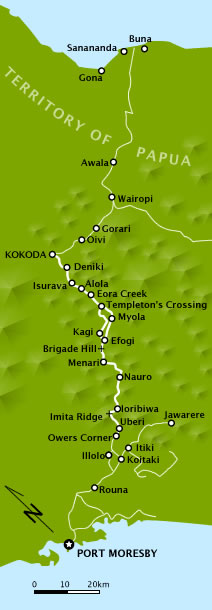
A map depicting locations along the Kokoda Track

After the Imperial Japanese had suffered setbacks at the battle of the Coral Sea and battle of Midway in May–June 1942, the Imperial General Headquarters postponed the planned operation to capture Fiji, Samoa and New Caledonia. The Japanese 17th Army's Lieutenant General Harukichi Hyakutake was tasked to conduct an offensive against Port Moresby over the Owen Stanley Range. With the occupation of Port Moresby, it would remove the threat of air attacks against Rabaul and provide airfields to conduct raids against the bases, cities and sea lane supply lines around the north of Australia.

By mid-1942, however, the Allies had started to reinforce Papua and Port Moresby and started construction of airfields at Port Moresby and Milne Bay. General Sir Thomas Blamey, commander of Allied Land Forces, ordered Major General Basil Morris, commanding New Guinea Force to send a battalion of Australian infantry to Kokoda to defend against an overland attack on Port Moresby. On 14 July, B Company of the 39th Battalion, under Captain Sam Templeton arrived at Kokoda and reinforced the PIB, that was already deployed in the area. Through July, MacArthur was also planning to construct an airfield at Dobodura, a short distance inland from Buna. (Note: Anderson 2014, p. 25 reports that B Company of the 39th Battalion arrived at Kokoda on 14 July 1942. Some other sources (particularly McCarthy 1959, p. 117 and Brune 2004, p. 98) may report the arrival as 15 July. The company's arrival on 14 July can be confirmed against the war diaries of the 39th Battalion and the 30th Brigade.) (Note: Author, Eustace Keogh, clarifies that the initial deployment of the 39th Battalion was made with a separate aim, even though it was assigned a role as part of the planned construction.)

== Planning ==
With the failure to capture Port Moresby by sea landing due to the battle of the Coral Sea and the subsequent return of the invasion force to Rabaul, the Japanese 17th Army under Lieutenant General Harukichi Hyakutake considered the possibility of an overland offensive. This was based on pre-war intelligence that a road existed between Kokoda and Port Moresby. Aerial reconnaissance by the 25th Air Flotilla on 27 and 30 June reported the possibility of a road between Buna and Kokoda and further south toward Isurava. Based on this, planning progressed for an overland attack based on the South Seas Detachment, led by Major General Tomitarō Horii. It had previously been detailed for the aborted amphibious attack on Port Moresby.

The Yokoyama Advance Party, commanded by Colonel Yokoyama Yosuke, was to establish the beachhead and make a reconnaissance in force toward Kokoda. It consisted of the 1st Battalion, 144th Infantry Regiment, the 15th Independent Engineer Regiment and the 1st Company, 1st Battalion of the 55th Mountain Artillery Regiment. Including labour units and native carriers from Rabaul, it was to total 4,020, though not all of this force was to be landed by the first convoy. Naval units, including a company of 5th Sasebo Special Naval Landing Force and a company of 15th Naval Pioneer Unit were also being landed to establish an airfield near Buna. The rest of the South Seas Detachment was to be transported to Buna in August 1942. Horner estimates the initial landing at 1,800.

The Imperial Japanese Navy 4th Fleet provided naval support including Cruiser Division 18 led by Rear Admiral Kôji Matsuyama consisting of Tenryū and Tatsuta, Destroyer Division 29 consisting of Asanagi, Yūzuki and Uzuki, and the transports Ryōyō Maru, Kinryu Maru and Ayatosan Maru. The 25th Air Flotilla and the Tainan Air Corps, based at Rabaul, were to provide air cover for the transports and the landings.

== Landings ==
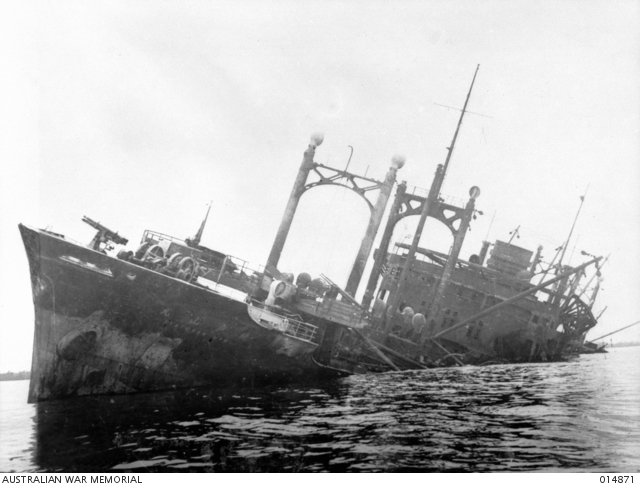
Wreck of the Ayatosan Maru, a transport which was sunk during the initial landing shortly after disembarkation. AWM014871

On 21 July 1942, a Japanese float plane strafed the mission station at Buna at 14:40. The Japanese convoy had arrived off Gona. It had been able to slip past the Allied air force as they had been attacking a convoy off Salamaua. With a few salvos of naval gunfire, the Japanese landings at Buna and Gona commenced at about 17:30 on 21 July 1942. (Note: It had been planned to land at Basabua, slightly to the east of Gona. The naval party landed about 5 kilometres (3 mi) northwest of Buna.) The small Australian party manning the wireless station at Buna withdrew without engaging the landing troops.

The landings were opposed by Allied air attacks until darkness fell and again from the following morning. Attacks were made by land-based United States Army Air Forces (USAAF) B-17 and B-26 bombers. The transport, Ayatosan Maru, was sunk on 22 July and the destroyer, Uzuki damaged slightly. Daily raids were undertaken in the Buna-Gona area by the USAAF and Royal Australian Air Force planes. Further Japanese attempts to build up the force at Buna managed to get past the Allied air forces. One transport convoy got through on 29 July, but the transport, Kōtoku Maru, was hit. Although most of the troops got ashore, it sank while returning to Rabaul. A third convoy was forced to return to Rabaul on 31 July.

The Japanese landings were observed by patrols of the PIB and officers of the ANGAU. Templeton had been at Buna on the morning of the landings. As he was returning that day, he received word of the landings. He ordered 11 Platoon to join him at Awala and 12 Platoon to advance to Gorari. His remaining platoon was to protect Kokoda. At about 16:00 on 23 July, a PIB patrol led by Lieutenant Chalk engaged advancing Japanese near Awala. The Japanese returned a heavy fire and the majority of the patrol "fled into the jungle". Templeton had returned to Kokoda, leaving Major William Watson, of the PIB, to command the forward action. Watson was planning a further ambush between Awala and Wairopi but 11 Platoon withdrew all the way to Wairopi. There, he destroyed the bridge and harassed Japanese as they attempted to cross the Kumusi River, before withdrawing 11 Platoon and what remained of his PIB on the afternoon of 24 July.

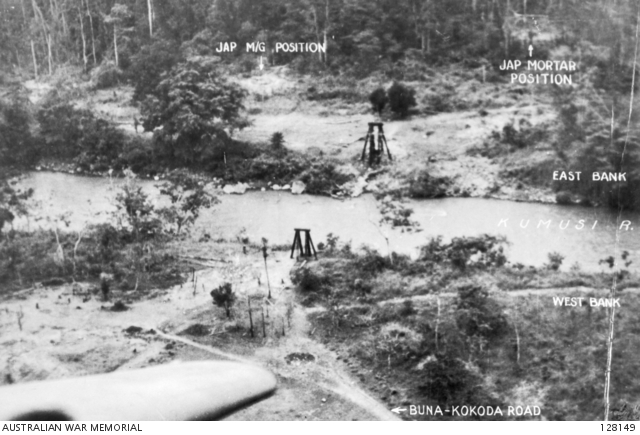
The crossing of the Kumusi River at Wairopi later in the campaign. AWM128149

Lieutenant Colonel William Owen, commanding officer of the 39th Battalion, had flown to Kokoda on 24 July and was met by Templeton. They went forward to the position at Gorari where the two forward platoons and PIB had gathered. He sighted an ambush position about 700 metres (800 yd) east of Gorari. Owen then returned to Kokoda and called for reinforcements to be landed. The ambush was sprung at about midday on 25 July, killing two Japanese, and the force withdrew back on Oivi, taking up a position that evening. D Company's 16 Platoon arrived by air at Kokoda in two flights on 26 July. The first flight arrived at 10:00, the second, at 11:30. They were immediately sent forward as they arrived. The first flight had joined the force at Oivi before the Japanese attack at 15:00. They were able to hold the Japanese for a time, before being forced to retire on a secondary position. Templeton was concerned for the second half of the D Company platoon yet to arrive – that it might run into Japanese trying to encircle his position. He set out to warn it. There was a burst of fire shortly after he left. Templeton was never seen by the Australians again. (Note: The second flight, under Corporal Morrison, was nearing Oivi at 17:30, when he was misinformed that Oivi was lost. He returned with his troops to Kokoda.) According to Peter Williams, Japanese records show that he was captured and subsequently executed.

Watson again took command. As the force was threatened with encirclement, it broke toward Deniki, guided by Corporal Sonopa of the PIB. At Kokoda, Owen had lost contact with his forward platoons and also withdrew on Deniki, departing at 11:00 on 27 July. On the following morning, a small party of stragglers arrived, having spent the previous night at Kokoda, they reported the village unoccupied. Leaving two sections at Deniki, he quickly advanced back to the village.

== Aftermath ==
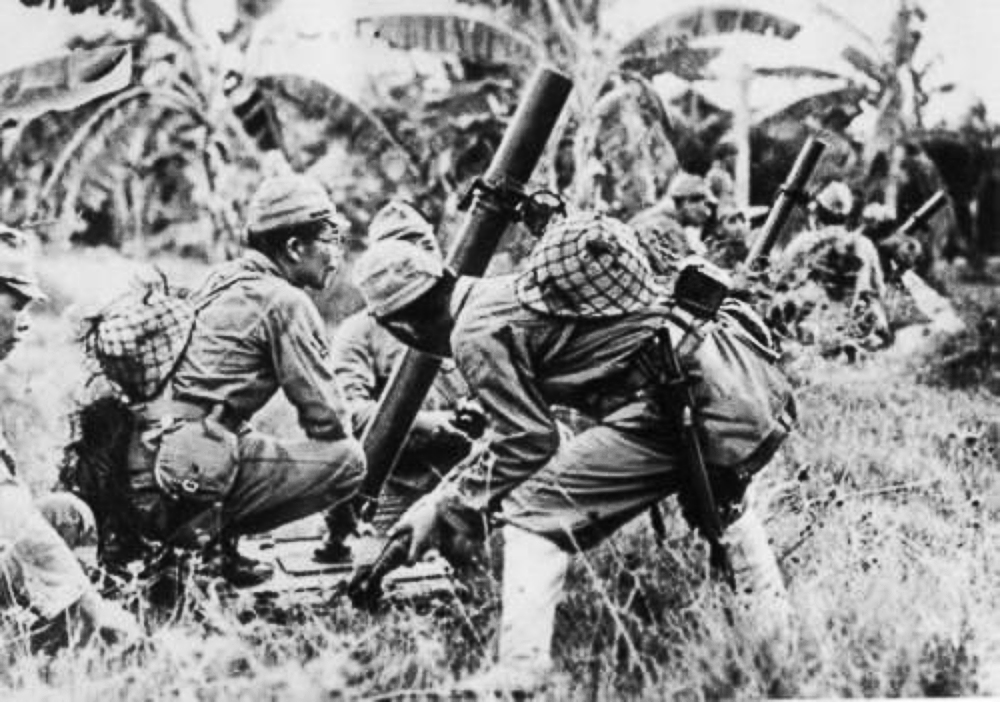
Soldiers of a Special Naval Landing Force are preparing their Type 97 mortars for firing

The Japanese forces had managed to capture the Buna–Gona area, establishing a beachhead from which they were able to support their attack on Port Moresby. A total of 4,057 personnel were landed from Yokoyama Force. Of these, an advanced guard of 230 was sent forward, and it was this force that fought the initial engagements against the small force of Australians, who numbered just 100 on 25 July when they ambushed the Japanese around Gorari. The Japanese landing was reinforced by successive convoys over the following weeks. The main force of the 144th Infantry Regiment landed on 18 August. The 41st Infantry Regiment (less 1st Battalion) landed on 21 August, with the 1st Battalion landing on 27 August.

Yokoyama's force captured Kokoda in an initial battle from 28–29 July and repulsed an attempt to recapture it from 8–10 August; pushing the Australian forces further back in an attack on Deniki from 13–14 August. Horii linked up with the advance party at Kokoda and began to assemble his force for the overland advance. By 26 August, it consisted of the 144th Infantry Regiment (three battalions), the 41st Infantry Regiment (2nd and 3rd Battalions, with the 1st Battalion yet to arrive – joining the main force on 14 September) and 1st Battalion, 55th Mountain Artillery Regiment.

Author Peter Williams records Australian casualties in the Buna area as including six ANGAU members killed. He records no Japanese ground forces killed until 25 July, when two were killed and six were wounded around Gorari. Another four Japanese were killed, and 10 were wounded, in fighting around Gorari on 26 July. Nine casualties were recorded amongst Yokoyama Force personnel on board Ayatozan Maru.

Author and historian David Horner is critical of MacArthur. He identifies the failure to advance plans to occupy Buna, given intelligence of the Japanese intent to do so; and, a failure to recognise the landings as an attempt to assault overland to Port Moresby, also despite intelligence. Furthermore, he reports that it was MacArthur's intent to allow the Japanese to attempt the overland assault. When this occurred, he identifies the inconsistencies in MacArthur's actions during the campaign that followed and in the battle at the beachheads after that.

=== Japanese war crimes ===
Nine Europeans, including a sixteen-year-old girl, were executed at Buna by members of the Sasebo Special Naval Landing Party. Amongst those killed were members of the PIB, Army signallers, several US airmen and two female missionaries, May Hayman and Mavis Parkinson. A party, including the two missionaries evaded capture for a time but were ambushed in August and the survivors executed after being interrogated.
