= 30th Brigade (Australia) =

Infantry brigade of the Australian Army during World War II

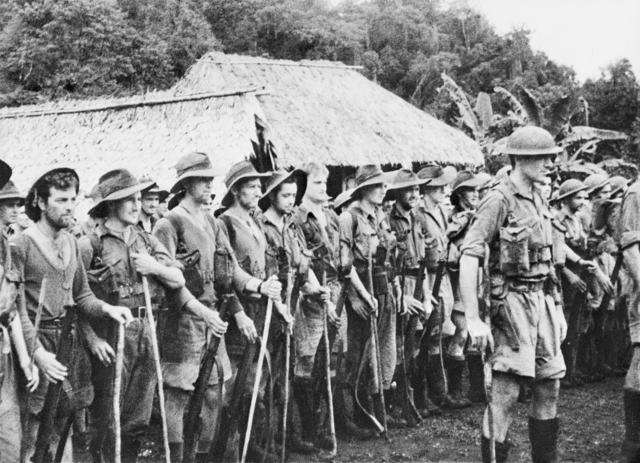
- Soldiers of the 39th Battalion—part of the 30th Brigade—following their relief in September 1942
- Active: 1941–1943
- Country: Australia
- Branch: Australian Army
- Type: Infantry
- Engagements: Second World War: New Guinea campaign

Commanders
- Notable commanders: Selwyn Porter

Insignia
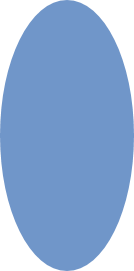
- Headquarters unit colour patch

The 30th Brigade was a brigade-sized infantry unit of the Australian Army. Formed in December 1941, as part of the Militia, the unit was raised for service during the Second World War. Established in response to Japan's entry into the war, the brigade's subordinate units were established in several Australian states. Some of these had already been dispatched to New Guinea before the brigade's headquarters was established, although the majority arrived there in early 1942.

Following their arrival, the brigade initially provided garrison troops to Port Moresby before later taking part in the fighting along the Kokoda Track during which elements took part in delaying actions around Kokoda and Isurava, before being relieved by units of the Second Australian Imperial Force.

After the campaign began to turn in favour of the Australians, the Japanese withdrew north towards their beachheads around Buna and Gona, and elements of the brigade were recommitted to the fighting. In early 1943, the 30th Brigade was withdrawn back to Australia and was disbanded in July 1943, with its personnel being redistributed to other formations.

== History ==
The brigade was raised as a Militia formation in December 1941 in response to Japan's entry into the war. The brigade's headquarters was opened in Sydney, New South Wales, although its constituent units were formed from a number of Australian states. Upon establishment the brigade was raised as an independent unit, and consisted of three infantry battalions – the newly re-formed Victorian-based 39th, the Queensland 49th and the 53rd from New South Wales – which were supported by the 23rd Heavy Anti-Aircraft Battery and the South Australian-based 13th Field Artillery Regiment, which was equipped with First World War vintage 18-pound field guns. The 7th Field Company was also allocated.

From the outset, it was formed to garrison Port Moresby, and indeed one of its battalions, the 49th, had been deployed to New Guinea as early as March 1941. Following the attacks on Pearl Harbor and Malaya; however, the decision was made to boost the force around Port Moresby up to a brigade-group sized force and as a result the 30th Brigade was formed. On 3 January 1942, the brigade headquarters and other elements deployed to New Guinea arriving on the troopship RMS Aquitania, joining the 49th.

Following its arrival in New Guinea, the brigade was initially employed in establishing defences around Port Moresby. The beach defences between Bootless Inlet and Tupuselei were expanded, and the 39th Battalion relieved elements of the 49th around 7-mile Drome. Meanwhile, the 13th Field Regiment's guns were assigned to beach defence. The 49th Battalion occupied the Pyramid Point – Ela Beach sector, and the 53rd Battalion occupied the Napa Napa Peninsula, relieving the Papuan Infantry Battalion. In February, the 53rd, less one company, was concentrated on beach defence; the following month the remaining company was withdrawn back to Port Moresby. During this time, the garrison was heavily tasked with labouring and construction duties that only limited training could be undertaken. A more dispersed defensive scheme was adopted in April, but in early May, as the Battle of Coral Sea raged, the troops were moved into positions along the beach as the threat of invasion loomed.

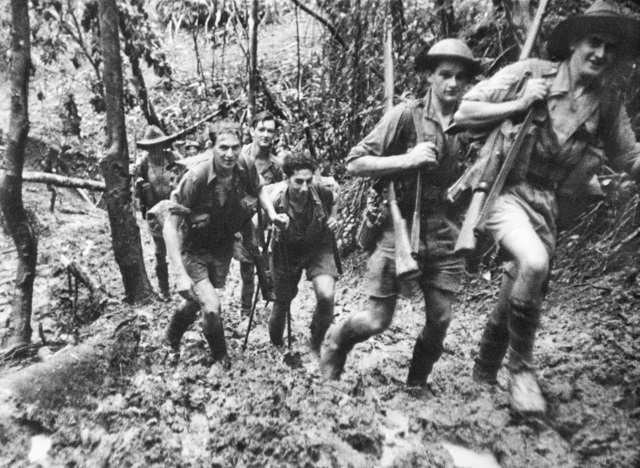
Members of the 39th Battalion withdrawing after the Battle of Isurava

The 14th Brigade arrived to reinforce the garrison in late May, freeing up the 39th Battalion to assume the role of brigade reserve, which saw it move to 3-Mile Valley. After the Japanese landings at Buna in mid-July 1942, the 39th Battalion was detached to Maroubra Force and was sent up the Kokoda Track to Kokoda to provide a blocking force. During the subsequent Kokoda Track campaign, the 39th fought a series of desperate delaying actions to slow the Japanese advance on Port Moresby throughout July and August around Kokoda and Isurava, where they were joined by the brigade's headquarters and the 53rd Battalion. After heavy fighting, the 30th was relieved by the 21st and 25th Brigades as veteran Second Australian Imperial Force units, which had been hurriedly brought back from the Middle East, were rushed to New Guinea to help shore up the Australian position. That month, elements of the brigade were detached to form Honnor Force; the 30th Brigade moved to Laloki River, as Honnor Force attempted to interdict Japanese lines of communication and the 49th Battalion cleared the area around Mt Lawes.

The 49th Battalion was relieved by the US 128th Infantry Regiment and the brigade redeployed to guard exfiltration points from the Sogeri Plateau, with elements around 17-Mile, Hombrom Bluff, the lower Goldie River, Merigeda Mission and Laloki Airfield. As the tide of the Kokoda Track campaign turned in the Allies favour, the Japanese began withdrawing back towards Buna. In October 1942, the brigade was withdrawn back to Port Moresby where 53rd Battalion was amalgamated with the 55th Battalion to form the 55th/53rd Battalion. After this, the brigade undertook garrison duties and further training in Port Moresby before taking part in the liberation of Gona and Sanananda during the Battle of Buna–Gona. It was committed to the fighting in December 1942 when the 39th Battalion was dispatched to Gona, and the 49th and 55th/53rd Battalions reinforced the Australian units that were fighting around Sanananda.

In early 1943, the brigade was flown back to Port Moresby, prior to its return to Australia. for reorganisation. During this time, the 3rd Battalion was added to its order of battle. Based at Wondecla, on the Atherton Tablelands in Queensland, the brigade was brought back up to establishment and was transferred to the 6th Division, with a view to participating in further operations in New Guinea; however, it was decided to reallocate its manpower to reinforce the rest of the 6th Division. From the 49th Battalion those that volunteered to serve with the AIF were sent to the 2/1st Battalion and those from the 39th went to the 2/2nd. The 3rd Battalion received a batch of reinforcements from survivors of the 2/22nd Battalion who had escaped from Rabaul, and it was renamed the 3rd/22nd Battalion. This was short lived, though, as its AIF personnel were transferred to the 2/3rd Battalion while its Militiamen were sent to the 36th and 55th/53rd Battalions. The 30th Brigade was subsequently disbanded on 3 July.

== Attached units ==
Over the course of the brigade's existence, its order of battle changed a number of times as various infantry battalions were force assigned or reallocated to other brigades. The following units were attached at various times:

- 3rd Battalion
- 39th Battalion
- 49th Battalion
- 55th/53rd Battalion

== Commanding officers ==
The following officers commanded the 30th Brigade:

- Brigadier Neville Hatton
- Brigadier Selwyn Porter
