= Maroubra Force =

- Active: c. 1942
- Country: Australia
- Branch: Australian Army
- Type: Ad hoc formation
- Size: ~ 3–6 infantry battalions
- Part of: New Guinea Force
- Engagements: Second World War: New Guinea campaign

Commanders
- Notable commanders: Selwyn Porter; Arnold Potts

Maroubra Force was the name given to the ad hoc Australian infantry force that defended Port Moresby, Papua New Guinea from the Japanese, and was involved in the Kokoda Track Campaign of the Pacific War, World War II. The force was established by the Allies under the codename "Maroubra", referring to the troops in the forward area, it was one of many units forming the body of the New Guinea Force, the main Allied army formation in the South West Pacific Area during 1942.

Formed on 21 June 1942, it initially consisted of part-time Militia units and was under the command of Major General Basil Morris's New Guinea Force. Reinforced by veteran Second Australian Imperial Force units, Maroubra Force was instrumental in blunting the Japanese advance on Port Moresby, fighting it to a standstill in September, before elements of the 7th Division undertook a counter-attack in October and November 1942, which drove the Japanese back to their beachheads around Buna–Gona, which was the scene of heavy fighting between November 1942 and January 1943.

== History ==
In mid-1942, Major General Basil Morris, commander of New Guinea Force, ordered the 39th Infantry Battalion, which had previously been deployed as a garrison force around Port Moresby, sent overland via the Kokoda Track to secure the Kokoda area and prepare to defend against a Japanese advance. The Papuan Infantry Battalion of about 300 native troops with white officers, was already north of the Owen Stanley Range at the entrance of the Kokoda Track. These units were subsequently grouped together as "Maroubra Force" – named for Operation Maroubra, which was the Allied name for the troops in the "forward area" on the Kokoda Track – formed around the units of Brigadier Selwyn Porter's 30th Brigade, which was made up of part-time Militia soldiers. On 21 July 1942, the Japanese landed on the northeast coast of Papua and the Papuan Infantry Battalion was overwhelmed by the Japanese troops, and the entrance was captured on 29 July 1942.

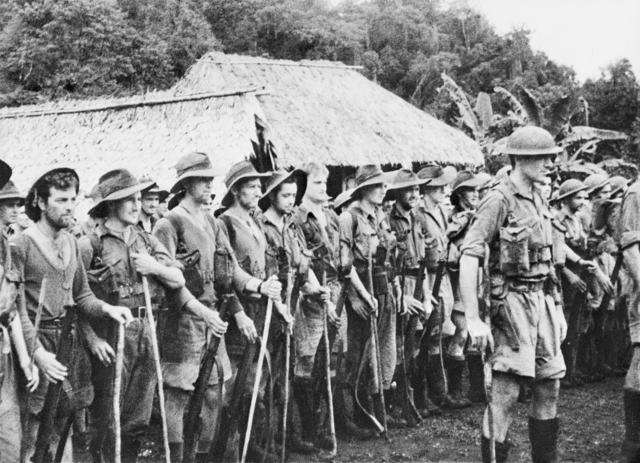
Soldiers of the 39th Battalion following their relief in September 1942

Bolstered by the arrival of the 53rd Infantry Battalion in early August, Maroubra Force then successfully fought to delay the Japanese advance through the Owen Stanley Range, before being reinforced by Second Australian Imperial Force troops from the 21st Brigade and finally halting the Japanese around Ioribaiwa. The 25th Brigade, later reinforced by the 16th Brigade, then pursued the Japanese north from Ioribaiwa as the Japanese withdrew back to their beachheads at Buna, Gona and Sanananda on the Papuan north coast. Within sources dealing with the fighting in New Guinea, Maroubra Force remains an enigmatic entity. While authors such as Eustace Keogh, Brune and McCarthy largely fall silent on the formation after the Battle of Ioribaiwa in mid-September, Chant states that Maroubra Force later participated in the fighting around Gona. Nevertheless, the last mention of the Maroubra codename in the New Guinea Force Headquarters War Diary appears on 28 October. (Note: Situation reports issued by NGF Headquarters continued to identify the 7th Division as "Maroubra" until 17 November, effectively, the end of the Kokoda campaign and commencement of operations for the advance toward the beachheads at Buna and Gona.)

During the fighting around Buna and Gona, between November 1942 and January 1943, Porter's 30th Brigade, which had been withdrawn earlier, reinforced elements of the 7th Division – the 18th and 25th Brigades – and eventually took part in the reduction of the Japanese beachhead there. The 21st Brigade also took part in the fighting around the Japanese beachheads, suffering heavy casualties.

== Commanders ==
An ad hoc command, Maroubra Force was variously commanded by the senior officer in the forward area of the battle, which meant that command changed hands on a number of occasions. Major (later Lieutenant Colonel) Allan Cameron took command of the formation during the fighting around Kokoda after the death of Lieutenant Colonel William Owen, while Lieutenant Colonel Ralph Honner filled the role during the brief period between Kokoda and Isurava. Brigadier Selwyn Porter (30th Brigade) and Brigadier Arnold Potts (21st Brigade) also held the position. Potts was later relieved of his command in controversial circumstances following actions at Isurava, Eora Creek and Templeton's Crossing, and Efogi. He was replaced by Porter in early September prior to the Battle of Ioribaiwa. Maroubra Force then passed to Brigadier Kenneth Eather, commander of the 25th Brigade, for the fighting around Ioribaiwa and the counter-offensive that followed.

== Strength and casualties ==
According to Chant, "at its peak strength, Maroubra Force consisted of the 39th and 53rd Infantry Battalions, and the 21st Brigade (2/14th, 2/16th and 2/27th Infantry Battalions). The 53rd Militia Battalion saw action briefly during the Battle of Isurava but was defeated and subsequently withdrew greatly demoralised, especially after the commanding officer and many senior officers of the 53rd were killed in action". Williams provides a contrasting assessment, though, stating that just prior the fighting around Ioribaiwa, following the arrival of the 25th Brigade, Maroubra Force totaled 2,957 personnel – up from 2,292 at the start of Isurava – with a combined headquarters from both the 21st and 25th Brigades, the 25th Brigade's three infantry battalions, a composite 21st Brigade infantry battalion, and various supporting elements including a signals detachment, medical support and a small reconnaissance element. These forces lacked artillery support, as the Australians' limited artillery resources were concentrated around Port Moresby at the start of the campaign, and due to logistical issues they were unable to move the guns forward along the track to support the infantry in the forward areas.

The fighting around Kokoda and Buna–Gona resulted in heavy casualties for Maroubra Force. According to James, the fighting along the Kokoda Track left over 600 Australians dead with more than 1,600 wounded over a four-month period for the total force engaged (not just Maroubra Force); there were further casualties around Buna and Gona also. The example of the 39th Infantry Battalion highlights the intensity of the fighting. By the end of the fighting in January 1943, according to Chant, the 39th Battalion had been so heavily depleted there were only 30 fully fit personnel available from a nominal strength of between 600 and 800. The remainder were either "dead, missing, wounded, or in hospitals in Port Moresby and northern Australia suffering from disease and exhaustion". It was subsequently evacuated to Port Moresby before returning to Australia, where the 30th Brigade was eventually disbanded, with many of its personnel being redistributed to 2nd AIF units. Maroubra Force, and its commanding officers Honner and Potts are sometimes cited as some of "the men who saved Australia", having played an important part in the successful defence of Port Moresby.
