= 53rd Battalion (Australia) =

Australian Army infantry battalion

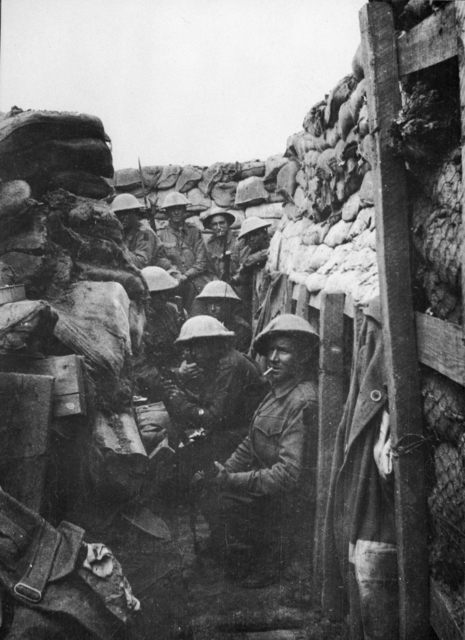
- Members of the Australian 53rd Battalion on 19 July 1916 before the Battle of Fromelles.
- Active: 1916–1919; 1921–1937; 1941–1942
- Country: Australia
- Branch: Australian Army
- Type: Infantry
- Size: ~800–1,000 (Note: During World War I, the standard size of an Australian infantry battalion was 1,023 men. At the start of World War II this had reduced to 910 and with the establishment of the jungle division it fell further to 803.)
- Part of: 14th Brigade, 5th Division; 30th Brigade
- Nickname: West Sydney Regiment Whale Oil Guards
- Engagements: World War I: Western Front; World War II: New Guinea campaign

Insignia
- Unit colour patch

The 53rd Battalion was an infantry battalion of the Australian Army. Raised in 1916 for service during World War I the battalion served on the Western Front until the end of the war, before being briefly amalgamated with the 55th Battalion and then eventually disbanded in 1919. In 1921, the 53rd Battalion was re-raised and in 1927 adopted the title of the "West Sydney Regiment". In 1937 they were once again amalgamated with the 55th, forming the 55th/53rd Battalion (New South Wales Rifle/West Sydney Regiment).

In October 1941, during World War II, the two battalions were delinked and the 53rd was later deployed to New Guinea, where they took part in the Kokoda Track campaign. Poorly prepared and trained, and lacking up to date equipment, they did not perform well and were amalgamated with the 55th once more in October 1942, with whom they took part in further campaigns in New Guinea and Bougainville, before being disbanded in May 1946.

== History ==
=== World War I ===
The 53rd Battalion was initially raised in mid-February 1916 as part of the expansion of the all-volunteer First Australian Imperial Force (1st AIF) that took place in Egypt during World War I. Formed from reinforcements sent from Australia and experienced men drawn from the 1st Battalion, the 53rd was assigned to the 14th Brigade, 5th Division. Upon formation, they took part in the defence of the Suez Canal against forces of the Ottoman Empire, for which they received their first theatre honour, that of "Egypt 1916", although they did not take part in any actual fighting. The battalion's first commanding officer was Lieutenant-Colonel Ignatius Bertram Norris.

Later, as the Australian infantry divisions were moved to the European battlefield, the battalion was moved to France in June 1916, where they took their place in the trenches along the Western Front. Their first involvement in the fighting came at the Battle of Fromelles on 19–20 July 1916, where the battalion took part in the first stages of the Allied attack. Norris, who personally led the battalion's advance, was mortally wounded by shell-fire as he reached the German line. The 53rd suffered 600 casualties at Fromelles, a toll that represented about a third of its total casualties during the war.

The battalion remained at the front for the next two months, before being withdrawn for a rest. Once that was over, the battalion rotated between manning defensive positions at the front and undertaking training and labouring duties in the rear areas. After spending the winter in the trenches in the Somme Valley, in early 1917 after the Germans withdrew to the Hindenburg Line to shorten their lines of communication and free up reserves, the 53rd Battalion took part in the brief Allied pursuit, culminating in them being committed to hold the ground won during the Second Battle of Bullecourt. Later in the year, they were moved to Ypres in Belgium, where they took part in the Battle of Polygon Wood in late September.

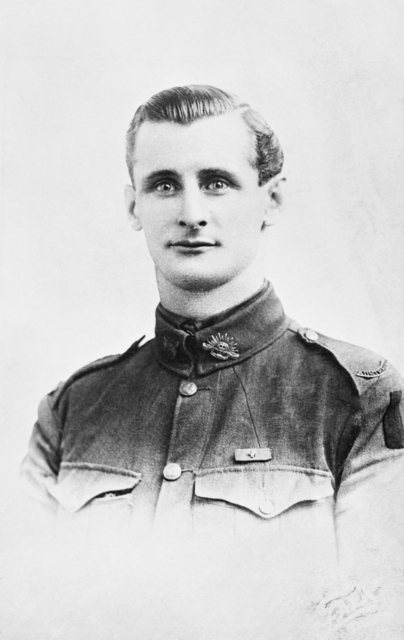
Private William Currey, who received the Victoria Cross for his actions during the Battle of Mont Saint-Quentin.

In early 1918, following the collapse of Russia and the end to fighting on the Eastern Front, the Germans concentrated their forces in the west and launched a majority offensive, which became known as the Spring Offensive. As the Allies were pushed back by the offensive, the Australian divisions were brought south to the Somme to help blunt the German advance. Within this the 53rd Battalion manned defensive positions to the north Villers-Bretonneux, holding their positions even though the town fell into German hands during the Second Battle of Villers-Bretonneux.

When the Allied Hundred Days Offensive began in August, the 53rd Battalion was not initially involved. Close to the end of August, the 53rd Battalion, along with the rest of the 14th Brigade were committed to the fighting around Péronne, with the 53rd Battalion attacking Anvil Wood during the Battle of Mont Saint-Quentin. For his actions during the fighting, one member of the battalion, William Currey, was later awarded the Victoria Cross.

The 53rd Battalion's final involvement in the fighting came late in September when they took part in the Battle of St. Quentin Canal. Afterwards, they were withdrawn from the line along with the rest of the Australian Corps shortly after this and was still in the process of re-organisation when the Armistice came into effect. Shortly afterwards the process of demobilisation began. As numbers dwindled, the battalion was merged with the 55th Battalion in March 1919. They were disbanded a month later, on 11 April 1919.

During its active service, the 53rd Battalion suffered 2,294 casualties, of which 647 were killed. Aside from Currey's Victoria Cross, other decorations bestowed upon men from the 53rd were: five Distinguished Service Orders, one Officer of the Order of the British Empire, 25 Military Crosses with three Bars, 28 Distinguished Conduct Medals, 76 Military Medals with four Bars, four Meritorious Service Medals and 20 Mentions in Despatches. (Note: In addition to this, there were five foreign awards bestowed, although the sources do not elaborate as to what these were.) The 53rd was awarded a total of 16 battle honours for its involvement in the war, receiving these in 1927.

=== Inter-war years ===
In April 1921, the AIF was disbanded. In May, the militia was reformed, to perpetuate the designations and battle honours of the AIF. At this time the 53rd Battalion was re-raised around Sydney, the area from where many of the battalion's original recruits in 1916 had come. Upon formation, the battalion drew its personnel mainly from the 2nd Battalion, 53rd Infantry Regiment, as well as parts of the 3rd and 45th Infantry Regiments. In 1927, when territorial designations were adopted, it became the 53rd Battalion (West Sydney Regiment). In 1927, the battalion adopted the motto of "Be Prepared". This was changed to Usque Ad Finemm ("To the Very End"), in 1933.

Due to the impact of the Great Depression, and a general complacency towards matters relating to defence, the battalion had few volunteers and limited funding. In October 1936, the decision was made to amalgamate the battalion. Initially, it was amalgamated with the 3rd Battalion (The Werriwa Regiment). This only lasted a couple of months before they were delinked. In August 1937, the 53rd was amalgamated with the 55th Battalion, forming the 55th/53rd Battalion (New South Wales Rifle/West Sydney Regiment). This reformed a partnership that had begun at the end of the previous war, and continued into the next. Throughout the inter-war years, the battalion maintained an alliance with the South Staffordshire Regiment.

=== World War II ===
At the outset of the World War II, due to the provisions of the Defence Act (1903) which prohibited sending the Militia to fight outside of Australian territory, (Note: This stipulation also applied to the 2,800-strong Permanent Military Force.) (Note: Of the 32 Militia battalions that saw active service during the war, all but three were given AIF status. Essentially this meant that as more than 65 per cent of their wartime establishment had volunteered for service overseas, the battalion could be sent anywhere, including outside of Australian territory. The 53rd Battalion was one of the three battalions not to receive this status, although as the 55th/53rd it did later become an AIF unit.) the decision was made to raise an all volunteer force to serve overseas. Initial operations were conceived to be likely in the Middle East, France and later possibly the United Kingdom. It was decided that the Militia would be used to defend the Australian mainland and to improve Australia's overall level of readiness in the event of war in the Pacific, through the reinstitution of compulsory military service and extended periods of training.

In October 1941, the 55th/53rd Battalion was undertaking a period of continuous training at Bathurst, New South Wales, when it was announced that they were to be delinked once more and the 53rd would be sent to act as a garrison force in Darwin, Northern Territory. The battalion was brought up to full strength from other Militia units. In December, as they were due to embark for the trip to the north, they were still below strength and in order to meet this shortfall they received a draft of 104 conscripts. Taken at short notice from units in the Sydney area, many of these men had just turned 18 and had received little or no military training. They embarked upon the Aquitania, but instead of being sent to Darwin they were diverted to Port Moresby, arriving there on 3 January 1942 and becoming part of the 30th Brigade. Japan had entered the war the previous month and the battalion was to form part of the garrison for the port, in case of a possible invasion.

Suffering badly from malaria and other tropical diseases, the men were mainly used to provide work parties, instead of undertaking the training that they would require for the fighting that would come. In June, the 53rd was attached to Maroubra Force. In July, it was split up, with two companies—'B' and 'C'—being sent to the area around Kokoda to reinforce the 39th Battalion, while the remainder of the battalion remained around Port Moresby in preparation to move up the Kokoda Track. In July the battalion received eight officer reinforcements from experienced 2nd AIF units. On 10 August, the 53rd Battalion was ordered to relieve the 39th, which was at the time positioned around Uberi. The two detached companies moved into position and upon their arrival they received a number of Bren guns and had a small amount of training with them, but it was not enough to bring them up to the standard required for combat against the battle-hardened Japanese soldiers that they were about to come up against.

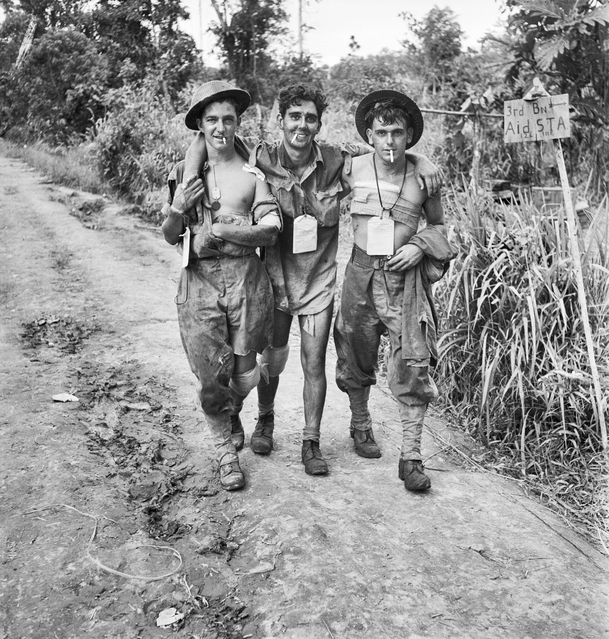
55th/53rd Battalion wounded, Sanananda, December 1942

Meanwhile, the rest of the battalion moved up to link up with 'B' and 'C' Companies. Upon arrival, they took up a position around Isurava, defending a parallel track to the main one, which bypassed the main Australian position. As the Japanese probed the 53rd's position, confusion amongst the Australians reigned as the Japanese managed to infiltrate their perimeter and achieve a break-in. A number of the battalion's senior officers were killed in the attack, including their commanding officer, Lieutenant Colonel Kenneth Ward. As a result of this loss, communications between the companies broke down, rendering co-ordinated action impossible and 53rd began to fall back. This came at the worst possible moment for the Australians, as it left a gap in their defences along the Kokoda Track, leaving the way open for the Japanese to march straight through to Alola. The Japanese failed to exploit it, before the 2/16th Battalion was brought up to plug the gap, and as a result a possible disaster was averted. Nevertheless, a certain amount of stigma was attached to the battalion's performance, and they were later described as "the mob".

Instances of sickness and disease continued to deplete the battalion, and by the beginning of September they were down to just 213 men. During this time 'C' Company was detached to support the 2/14th Battalion, while the main body was brought back to Efogi, where they manned a defensive position along the track running to Kagi, and established a line through which the 21st Brigade and the 39th Battalion withdrew. Holding their position as required, the 53rd Battalion remained in the line until the night of 5 September, when they were ordered to fall back along the track.

Despite performing creditably following their initial exposure to the fighting, the stigma attached to their performance at Isurava stuck, and they were ordered back further still. They were eventually removed from the front line fighting, being utilised instead in mundane garrison duties in the rear areas, while 100 men were transferred to reinforce the 39th Battalion. A small draft of about 40 men were sent to the 36th Battalion around this time. On 27 October 1942 the battalion was amalgamated once again with the 55th Battalion. Around this time, the battalion's machine gun company was detached and in conjunction with several other Militia machine gun companies, it was used to form the 7th Machine Gun Battalion.

The 55th Battalion had itself been involved in the campaign, serving around Port Moresby and Milne Bay. After they were linked once more, the 55th/53rd went on to serve with success around Sanananda and then later during the Bougainville campaign in 1944–45. During the 53rd's brief involvement in the war, it lost 21 men killed or died, and a further 23 wounded. There were no individual decorations bestowed on members of the 53rd. In 1961, the battalion was awarded four battle honours for the New Guinea campaign.

== Battle honours ==
The 53rd Battalion received the following battle and theatre honours:

- World War I: Somme 1916–18, Bullecourt, Ypres 1917, Menin Road, Polygon Wood, Poelcappelle, Passchendaele, Ancre 1918, Villers-Bretonneux, Amiens, Albert 1918, Mont St Quentin, Hindenburg Line, St Quentin Canal, St Quentin Canal, France and Flanders 1916–18, Egypt 1916.
- World War II: South-West Pacific 1942–45, Buna–Gona, Sanananda Road, Liberation of Australian New Guinea.

== See also ==
- Military history of Australia during World War II

== Notes ==
Footnotes

Citations
