= 39th Battalion (Australia) =

Australian Army infantry battalion

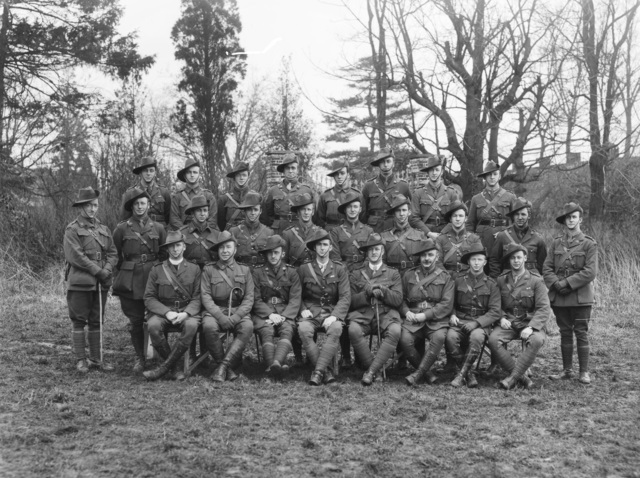
- 39th Battalion officers, Belgium, January 1918
- Active: 1916–1919; 1921–1937; 1941–1943
- Disbanded: 3 July 1943
- Country: Australia
- Branch: Australian Army
- Type: Infantry
- Size: ~1,000 men all ranks (Note: During World War I the authorised strength of Australian infantry battalions was 1,023 men, and fell to just 409 men of all ranks during the inter-war years. During World War II, battalion strength fluctuated frequently, but was authorised at around 900 in the early stages before the Army was reorganised for jungle warfare in mid-1943.)
- Part of: 10th Brigade, 3rd Division (WWI); 30th Brigade (WWII)
- Nickname: Hawthorn–Kew Regiment
- Colours: Brown over red
- Engagements: World War I: France and Flanders 1916–18; World War II: Kokoda Track Campaign; Battle of Buna–Gona

Commanders
- Notable commanders: William Owen †; Ralph Honner

Insignia
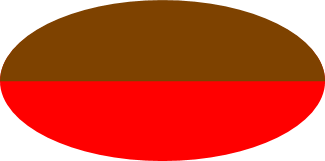
- Unit colour patch

The 39th Battalion was an infantry unit of the Australian Army. It was originally raised in February 1916 for service during World War I as part of First Australian Imperial Force, with personnel being drawn mainly from the state of Victoria. Making up part of the 10th Brigade, it was attached to the 3rd Division and served on the Western Front in France and Belgium before being disbanded in March 1919. Following the re-organisation of the Australian Army in 1921, the battalion was raised again in Victoria as a unit of the Citizens Force, becoming known as the "Hawthorn–Kew Regiment". In 1937, it was amalgamated with the 37th Battalion to become the 37th/39th Battalion. Later, in August 1939 it was delinked with the 37th and amalgamated with the 24th Battalion to form the 24th/39th Battalion, before being raised again as a single unit in October 1941.

During World War II the battalion was sent to New Guinea in 1942 as part of the 30th Brigade to defend the territory against a Japanese attack. Subsequently, between July and August of that year the unit was heavily engaged in the defence of Port Moresby, fighting along the Kokoda Track. The 39th fought several desperate actions against the Japanese as they attempted to hold out until further reinforcements could be brought up from Port Moresby. They were also later involved in the fighting around Buna–Gona. Such was their involvement in the battle that by the time they were withdrawn they could only muster 32 men and following its return to Australia, the unit was disbanded in early July 1943.

== History ==
=== World War I ===
==== Formation ====
The 39th Battalion was first formed on 21 February 1916 at the Ballarat Showgrounds, in Victoria, for service during World War I. Under the command of Lieutenant Colonel Robert Rankine, the battalion was raised as part of an expansion of the First Australian Imperial Force (1st AIF) that took place at the conclusion of the Gallipoli Campaign. The majority of the battalion's recruits came from the Western District of Victoria, and together with the 37th, 38th and 40th Battalions, it formed the 10th Brigade, which was part of the 3rd Division. Following a brief period of training in Ballarat, the 39th Battalion marched through Melbourne on 15 May as the city farewelled the unit and they subsequently embarked upon HMAT Ascanius on 27 May 1916, bound for the United Kingdom. Sailing via Cape Town, the battalion landed at Plymouth on 18 July 1916, and moved by train to Amesbury, before marching to Larkhill in the Salisbury Plain Training Area, where they undertook a period of four months training before being sent to France in November. After completing the Channel crossing on 23/24 November, they landed at Le Havre and moved to the front by train. On the night of 10 December, the battalion took its place in the trenches along the Western Front, relieving its sister battalion, the 37th, around Houplines in the Armentieres sector. They remained at the front for the next week, as part of their introduction to trench warfare, during which time the battalion repelled a small German raid and sent out patrols into "no man's land".

==== Western Front ====
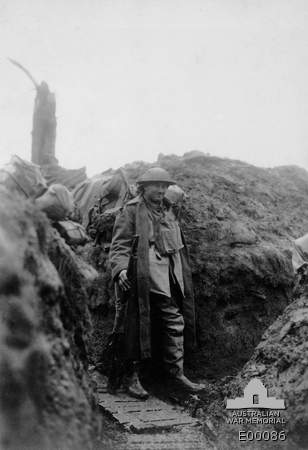
A member of the 39th Battalion in the trenches near Houplines, December 1916

After having endured a long winter in Flanders serving in mainly a defensive role, the battalion's first major engagement came at Messines, in Belgium in early June 1917. The battle began badly for the 39th. Near Ploegsteert Corner, during the march to the line of departure, the battalion suffered a high number of casualties following a German gas attack which subsequently resulted the 39th only being able to muster about a third of its manpower for the attack, amounting to an assault force of only 120 men. Despite this, the 39th was quickly reorganised into a single wave, and attacking on the 10th Brigade's right, it subsequently overcame the initial German opposition facing them and then, during the second phase of the battle advanced south of Douve, on the southern edge of the Messines Ridge. It was involved in further fighting north of Grey Farm, where they were initially held up by German machine-gun fire, but after this was overcome they continued to advance to their final objective, eventually digging-in 100 yards (91 m) beyond the farm, having managed to capture all of its objectives. Later, in October, the 39th Battalion took part in two other major attacks in that same sector, firstly at Broodseinde and then at Passchendaele, the first of which was a brilliant success, while the second was a disastrous failure.

During the fighting around Broodseinde on 4 October, the 39th formed the third wave of the 10th Brigade's attack, which went in around 6:00 am. Following up the 37th and 38th Battalions, they advanced against strongly held pill-boxes towards the Gravenstafel Switch. After digging-in, a party from the 39th joined the 40th Battalion as it launched the final wave in the brigade's attack. As the 40th came up against stiff opposition, more men from the 39th were pushed forward and the objective was finally secured around 11:00 am. After the battle, the 39th remained in the line until 6 October, when it was withdrawn back to Morbecque for reorganisation and rest. A couple of days later, the battalion was recommitted to the fighting and ordered to advance towards Passchendaele Ridge, attacking on the morning of 12 October despite heavy rain the previous evening. In the heavy fighting that followed, the battalion managed to secure its first objective, but was forced to withdraw when its flanks became threatened as neighbouring units had been unable to advance with them through the thick mud.

Over the course of the next five months, the 39th Battalion rotated between the front line and rear areas, holding the line in Belgium throughout winter. In the spring of 1918, when the German Army launched its last effort at victory, known as the Spring Offensive, the 39th was among the many Australian battalions that were hurriedly moved south to France in order to stem the tide of the German onslaught towards Amiens; fighting a series of defensive actions in the Somme between late March and early June. When the Allies launched their own offensive—the Hundred Days Offensive—on 8 August 1918, the battalion along with the rest of the 10th Brigade, was serving as the divisional reserve and they did not participate in the advance that has since become known as one of the greatest days for the Allies on the Western Front. On 10 August, the battalion was committed to battle once more, undertaking an attack on the village of Proyart, but this attack was ill-conceived and ultimately failed. Despite this, the battalion remained in the line throughout August and early September as the 3rd Division advanced through the Somme Valley.

The battalion undertook its last major action of the war at the end of September 1918 when, serving alongside the Americans, they breached parts of the Hindenburg Line along the St Quentin Canal. During this final battle, the battalion's long serving commanding officer, Lieutenant Colonel Robert Henderson, who had taken command in February 1917 before the battalion's first major battle, was killed in action. Late on 2 October, while around Gillemont Crescent, the 39th was relieved and the battalion was removed from the line to undertake training and reorganisation. In the middle of October, the 39th was bolstered by a company of reinforcements from the 37th, which had been disbanded to help make up losses in the other 10th Brigade units. Nevertheless, the 39th did not see action again and they were still at the rear when the Armistice was declared on 11 November 1918. With the fighting over, the process of demobilisation began and slowly the men began marching out for repatriation to Australia. Finally, in March 1919, the 39th Battalion was disbanded. At this point, the battalion's remaining personnel were amalgamated with other units to form the 10th Demobilisation Regiment, with the last of its soldiers returning to Australia in May.

During the course of the war the 39th Battalion suffered 405 men killed, while a further 1,637 were wounded. Members of the battalion received the following decorations: two Distinguished Service Orders (DSOs), one Member of the Order of the British Empire (MBE), 14 Distinguished Conduct Medals (DCMs), 14 Military Crosses (MCs), 78 Military Medals (MMs) with three Bars, and 22 Mentions in Despatches (MIDs). For their involvement in the fighting on the Western Front, the 39th Battalion were awarded 14 battle honours in 1927.

=== Inter-war years ===
At the end of World War I there was a wholesale disbandment of units of the Australian Army as the wartime Army was disbanded and its personnel demobilised. In 1921, it was decided that there was a need to raise a part-time military force, known as the Citizens Force, which would take responsibility for the defence of the Australian mainland. This force was organised along the same lines of the 1st AIF, and the units raised kept the same numerical designation as the 1st AIF battalions. The AIF ceased to exist officially on 1 April 1921, and the Citizens Force was reorganised the following month on 1 May, adopting the numerical designations and structures of the AIF. As a part of this, the 39th Battalion was raised in 1921 in Melbourne. Upon formation, the battalion was attached to the 10th Brigade, 3rd Division, and the battalion drew personnel from the 22nd and 24th Infantry Regiments and the 29th Light Horse.

In 1927, territorial designations were adopted and the battalion assumed the title of the "Hawthorn Regiment". Three years later this was changed to the "Hawthorne–Kew Regiment". It assumed the motto of Factis Non Verbis in 1927. Initially, the battalion was kept up to strength with volunteers and men serving under the terms of the compulsory training scheme, but in 1929 the scheme was suspended by the newly elected Scullin Labor government and the Citizen Forces were renamed the Militia. The combination of the end to compulsory training and the financial hardships of the Great Depression meant that there were few volunteers available as men could not risk losing their jobs to undertake training and as a result throughout the 1930s a number of units were amalgamated or disbanded as the size of the Army was reduced. In 1937, the 39th Battalion was merged with the 37th Battalion, before later being delinked with the 37th in August 1939 and being amalgamated with the 24th Battalion, becoming the 24th/39th Battalion. An alliance with the Dorsetshire Regiment was approved in 1930, and in 1937 with the Queen's Own Cameron Highlanders when the 39th were very briefly amalgamated with 37th Battalion (Australia).

=== World War II ===
==== Formation ====
On 1 October 1941, the Australian Military Board issued an order re-raising the 39th Battalion as a single battalion of the Australian Military Forces, as Militiamen were called up for national service. The intent was to raise the battalion to relieve the Queensland-based 49th Battalion, which was serving as a garrison force around Port Moresby, and from the outset the battalion was formed from men who were transferred from a variety of infantry and light horse units, including the 24th/39th Battalion that had been deployed at Nagambie Road, in Seymour, Victoria, as well as elements from the Militia 2nd Cavalry and 3rd and 4th Infantry Divisions. Lieutenant Colonel Hugh Conran became the battalion's new commanding officer, having previously served with the 23rd Battalion during World War I, and in the Citizens Military Force after the war.

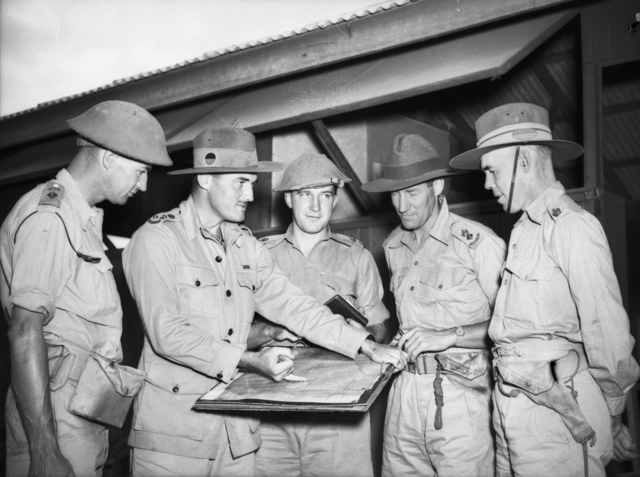
Officers of the 30th Brigade, including Lieutenant Colonel William Owen (second from the right) and his second-in-command, Major John Findlay (far right), July 1942

The battalion headquarters was opened at Darley Camp, near Bacchus Marsh, and by 8 October 1941, a nucleus of officers and senior non-commissioned officers (NCOs), many of whom had experience from World War I, had prepared the battalion for the arrival of the soldiers or other ranks (ORs) that would bring it up to its required establishment. On 10 October 1941, the first draft of nine officers and 523 men from the 3rd Infantry Division assembled at Caulfield Racecourse Transit Camp and were transported by rail to Darley Camp. The following day numbers increased further with the arrival of another seven officers and 400 men from the 2nd Cavalry and 4th Infantry Divisions. Later, in June 1942, after it had arrived in New Guinea, the battalion's strength was bolstered with the transfer of 16 officers from the Second Australian Imperial Force (2nd AIF), including a new commanding officer, Lieutenant Colonel William Owen.

On 21 November 1941, the 39th Battalion paraded through the streets of Melbourne with weapons. It had taken 52 days to form the battalion and while the battalion had still been understrength, they were declared ready for training. In the end, however, as events in the Pacific unfolded, this training was cut short and the battalion was only able to undertake one training exercise in this time. This exercise was code named the "Battle of Corangamite", and was conducted in the Victorian Western District, at the end of October.

Two days after the Japanese attack on the US fleet at Pearl Harbor and the British in Malaya, on 9 December 1941 the battalion was ordered to "prepare to move" as it was mobilised for war service. The threat of invasion by the Japanese changed the strategic situation and with it the planning forecasts of the Australian high command. As such, instead of relieving the 49th Battalion, the 39th was combined with the 49th and the New South Wales-based 53rd Battalion to form the 30th Brigade, and plans were made for the entire formation to deploy to New Guinea. Christmas Day 1941 was spent in camp, before the 39th Battalion was loaded onto two trains the following day for a rapid move north. One train went straight to Albury and the other departed from Spencer Street station, Melbourne, two hours later. Both trains arrived in Sydney at 10:40 hours, on 27 December 1941. The battalion then detrained and moved by ferry to Woolloomooloo Wharf where the 1,068 officers, NCOs and men of the battalion boarded the passenger ship the Aquitania bound for New Guinea.

==== Kokoda Track ====
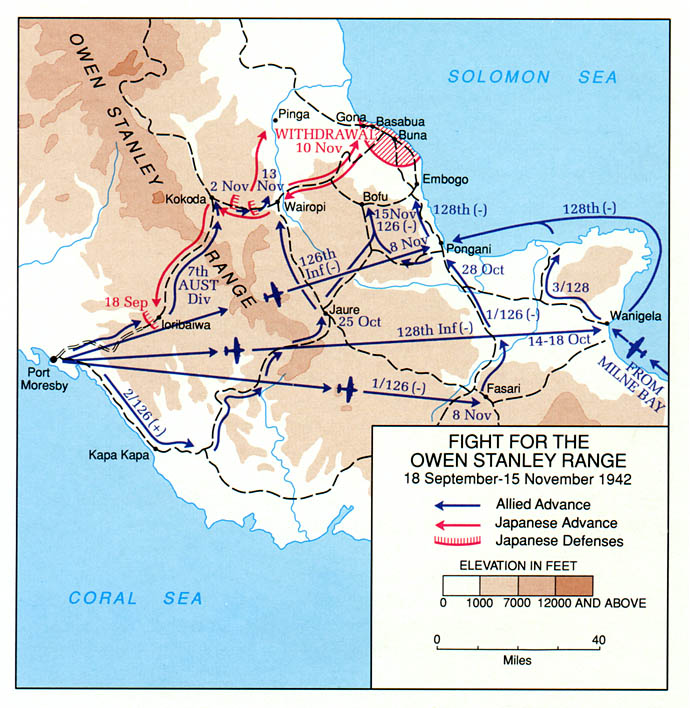
A map of the Kokoda Track and it surrounding areas.

Initially upon their arrival in New Guinea in January 1942 the 39th Battalion was used to defend the airfield at Seven Mile Aerodrome near Port Moresby and to carry out various other garrison tasks such as building defences and unloading stores at the wharf. In May 1942, the battalion's commanding officer, Conran, was deemed medically unfit for service and on 24 May he relinquished command. In June 1942, as the military situation in New Guinea deteriorated further, the battalion received orders to move up the Kokoda Track in order to act as a blocking force against the possibility of a Japanese advance overland from the north. In order to counter this threat, Maroubra Force composed of troops the 39th Battalion and the Papuan Infantry Battalion (PIB) were sent to Kokoda, arriving there on 15 July. This move proved prescient as a large Japanese force landed at Gona only a week later, and they quickly began to move inland towards Kokoda.

The first clash occurred at Awala on 23 July, when a platoon from 'B' Company, under the command of Captain Sam Templeton, having destroyed the footbridge over the Kumusi River, engaged the Japanese on the far side of the river. The Australians were forced to withdraw, however, when hundreds of Japanese marines began crossing the river under a barrage of mortar and machine gun fire. They withdrew only a few miles, before Templeton set up a successful ambush for the advancing Japanese on the banks of the Gorari Creek. Nevertheless, they were forced back further towards the high ground at Oivi where they attempted to make a stand while Templeton tried to make contact with battalion headquarters and the rest of the battalion who were spread out further along the track, in order to get more reinforcements.

On the evening of 29 July the Japanese attacked the main position Kokoda. There were only 80 men from 'B' Company left at that time, and armed only with small arms and a few Bren light machine guns, they were no match for the assaulting Japanese. Casualties on both sides were high as the Australians resorted to hand-to-hand combat, and the battalion's commanding officer, Lieutenant Colonel William Owen, who had flown in to take over the battalion following Templeton's death, was killed while organising the withdrawal. It became clear that Kokoda was lost and the following morning, under the cover of a dense mist, with the PIB's commanding officer, Major William Watson, assuming temporary command, the survivors abandoned the position and fell back towards the village of Deniki, a mile or so back along the Kokoda Track towards Isurava.

The remnants of 'B' Company regrouped at Deniki, but they were in a bad state and when on 4 August, Major Allan Cameron, brigade major of the 30th Brigade, arrived to take command of Maroubra Force, most of them were sent back to Isurava in disgrace as he was under the mistaken belief that they had run away from the fighting. Nevertheless, on 8 August the rest of the 39th Battalion, now without the only troops who had any experience fighting the Japanese, launched a counterattack at Kokoda. They managed to secure one side of the airfield, but due to the close proximity of the Japanese on the other side, relief aircraft were unable to land and short of food and ammunition, they were forced to fall back to Deniki once again after almost two days of fighting. They eventually managed to halt the Japanese advance and on 14 August Maroubra Force fell back to Isurava.

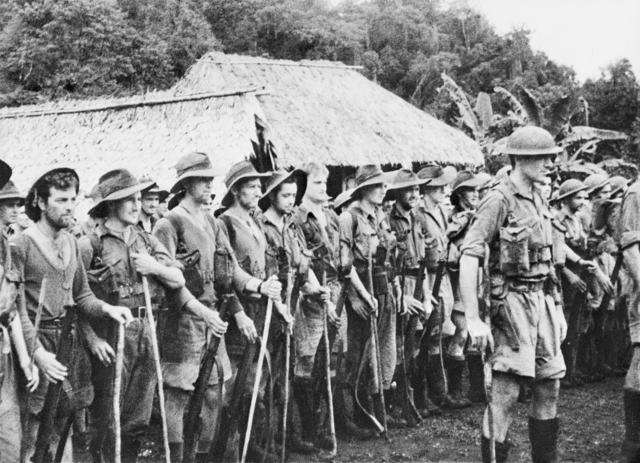
Soldiers of the 39th Battalion following their relief in September 1942

At this point the fighting ceased for almost two weeks and during this time the 39th was joined by the 53rd and the 30th Brigade headquarters; and Lieutenant Colonel Ralph Honner arrived from Ilolo to take command. Reaching the battalion at Isurava on 16 August, he subsequently began organising the battalion's defence of Isurava. On 23 August Brigadier Arnold Potts took over command of Maroubra Force and further reinforcements arrived as first the 2/14th, 2/16th and later the 2/27th Battalions from the 7th Division's 21st Brigade also reached the area. Despite this, the situation remained bleak as the supply issue was becoming a serious problem for the Australians and the reinforcements that had arrived were also in a state of disarray having been committed to the battle in a piecemeal fashion and suffering badly from hunger and disease.

Although the Japanese were experiencing similar problems in relation to supplies, they began their advance once again on 26 August and despite several rugged defensive actions the Australians were forced back again, first to Eora Creek on 30 August, then Templeton's Crossing on 2 September, and finally to Efogi three days later. Exhausted from their efforts and no longer able to be considered an effective fighting force, the 39th was relieved and sent down the track to Koitaki to rest. They had done the job that was required of them, having stalled the Japanese advance in order to allow reinforcements to be brought up. These reinforcements came in the shape of the 25th Brigade, comprising the 2/25th, 2/31st and 2/33rd Battalions. Bitter fighting ensued around Ioribaiwa and the Australians withdrew once again on 17 September, this time to Imita Ridge; however, the Japanese had reached their limit and on 24 September began to withdraw. The Australians subsequently launched a counter-offensive in October and by 2 November, Kokoda was back in Australian hands.

==== Fighting around Gona and disbandment ====
Following the 39th Battalion's withdrawal from the line in September 1942, they spent a month at Koitaki before being sent back to Port Moresby in mid-October, where they were detailed to prepare defensive positions. In November, they were attached to the 21st Brigade. Around this time, the battalion's machine gun company was detached and in conjunction with several other Militia machine gun companies, it was used to form the 7th Machine Gun Battalion. Throughout December the 39th Battalion was involved in further fighting as the brigade fought around Gona and Haddy's Village. During this time the 39th suffered heavy casualties, but the fighting continued and having captured the Gona Mission, the battalion moved to the Sanananda Track on 21 December, taking up a forward position at Huggins' Road Block. In the New Year the battalion was withdrawn to Soputa and returned to the 30th Brigade. They had suffered heavy casualties and in January 1943, when it was flown back to Port Moresby, it had a frontage of only seven officers and 25 men. In February, the 39th was ordered to prepare for operations in the Wau area, in anticipation of a further Japanese attack, but this attack did not eventuate and on 12 March the 39th Battalion embarked for the return journey to Australia.

Following the 39th Battalion's return to Australia, the men were given a period of leave before 30th Brigade was reconstituted on the Atherton Tablelands in Queensland. Initially, the plan was to reorganise the brigade and rebuild it prior to returning it to New Guinea, but in July it was decided that the 30th Brigade, along with its component battalions—the 39th, 49th, and 3rd Battalions—would be disbanded and used to reinforce the 6th Division, with reinforcements being sent to the 16th and 19th Brigades. This came into effect on 3 July 1943 and as a result of this decision, the Militiamen that had been called up for service were transferred to the 36th Battalion, a Militia battalion from New South Wales, while those who had volunteered for overseas service (Note: Within the meaning of the Defence Act (1903), overseas service was considered to be outside the immediate South-West Pacific Area and as the Militia could not be deployed outside this area, soldiers had to volunteer for the AIF to do so.) were sent to the 2/2nd Battalion; both of these units later saw further service in New Guinea.

At the end of the battalion's involvement in the fighting in New Guinea, 1,666 men had served in its ranks. The battalion suffered 403 combat casualties, which consisted of 118 killed in action, 13 died of wounds, five died other causes, and 266 wounded in action. (Note: The Australian War Memorial lists slightly different figures of 388 casualties consisting of 135 killed or died and 253 wounded.) Illness and disease also took a heavy toll and as a result, after six months of combat the 39th Battalion's muster roll was only seven officers and 25 other ranks. For their service during World War II members of the 39th Battalion received the following decorations: two MBEs, one DSO, four DCMs, seven MCs, 10 MMs, one US Distinguished Service Cross and 11 MIDs. The 39th received eight battle honours for the war in 1961; it was the only Australian unit to receive the "Kokoda Trail" battle honour.

== Battle honours ==
The 39th Battalion received the following battle honours:

- World War I: Messines 1917, Ypres 1917, Polygon Wood, Broodseinde, Poelcappelle, Passchendaele, Somme 1918, Ancre 1918, Amiens, Albert 1918, Mont St Quentin, Hindenburg Line, St Quentin Canal, France and Flanders 1916–18.
- World War II: South-West Pacific 1942–43, Kokoda Trail, Kokoda–Deniki, Isurava, Eora Creek–Templeton's Crossing I, Buna–Gona, Sanananda Road, Amboga River.

== Commanding officers ==
World War I

- Lieutenant Colonel Robert Rankine;
- Lieutenant Colonel Robert Henderson;
- Lieutenant Colonel Alexander Thomas Paterson.

World War II

- Lieutenant Colonel Hugh Marcell Conran;
- Lieutenant Colonel William Taylor Owen;
- Lieutenant Colonel Ralph Hyacinth Honner.

== Legacy ==
Since the end of the war, the 39th Battalion's involvement in the fighting around Kokoda has become a significant part of the narrative surrounding the Anzac legend and Australia's emergence as a modern nation. The battalion's actions were first shown in Damien Parer's 1942 film Kokoda Front Line, and more recently in the 2006 Australian movie Kokoda, which was based partly on Victor Austin's To Kokoda and Beyond.

After the war when Australia's part-time military forces were reformed in 1948, while many battalions that had been disbanded during the war were re-raised, the 39th was not. On 8 August 2006, the Australian Army raised the 39th (Personnel Support) Battalion (later re-designated the 39th Operational Support Battalion), adopting the 39th's numerical designation in order to perpetuate them on the order of battle. During the ceremony that was held at the Shrine of Remembrance in Melbourne, the Governor General, Major General Michael Jeffery, described the 39th Battalion as some of "Australia's most gallant soldiers", stating that the Australian nation was indebted to them for "their heroic service".

== Notes ==
Footnotes

Citations
