= 3rd Battalion (Australia) =

Australian Army infantry battalion

3rd Battalion, AIF 3rd Battalion (The Werriwa Regiment) 3rd Battalion, Royal New South Wales Regiment
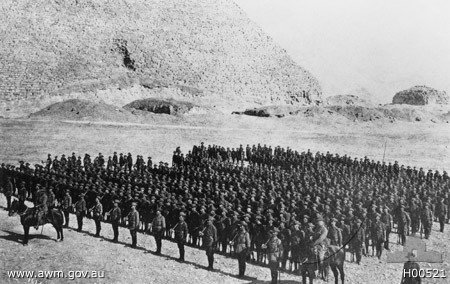
- 3rd Battalion on parade in Egypt, December 1914
- Active: 1914–1919; 1921–1943; 1948–1960; 1965–1987
- Country: Australia
- Allegiance: British Empire
- Branch: Australian Army
- Type: Infantry
- Role: Line infantry
- Part of: 1st Brigade (World War I); 14th Brigade (World War II); 30th Brigade (World War II)
- Colours: Brown over green
- Engagements: World War I: Gallipoli campaign; Western Front; World War II: New Guinea Campaign

Insignia
- Unit colour patch
- Abbreviation: 3 RNSWR

The 3rd Battalion was an infantry battalion of the Australian Army. Originally raised as part of the First Australian Imperial Force for service during World War I, the battalion formed part of the 1st Brigade, attached to the 1st Division. It was formed shortly after the war broke out and was among the first Australian units to be sent overseas, arriving in Egypt in December 1914. In April 1915 the battalion participated in the Landing at Anzac Cove, coming ashore in the second and third waves. In December 1915 the 3rd Battalion was evacuated from the Gallipoli peninsula and withdrawn to Egypt again, where it took part in the defence of the Suez Canal before being sent to France to fight on the Western Front in March 1916. For the next two and a half years the unit would serve in the trenches in France and Belgium and would take part in many of the major battles fought during that time. In May 1919, following the end of the war, the battalion was disbanded and its personnel repatriated back to Australia.

In 1921, the AIF was officially disbanded and the previously existing militia units of the Australian Military Forces were reorganised in order to perpetuate the designations and battle honours of their associated AIF units. As a result, the 3rd Battalion (The Werriwa Regiment), was raised around the area to the west of Sydney. Between 1921 and 1939 the battalion underwent a number of reorganisations and merges due to the economic pressures brought about by the Great Depression and subsequently in 1930 the battalion was merged with the 4th Battalion (Australian Rifles), before being delinked in 1937, when it was amalgamated with the 53rd Battalion (West Sydney Regiment).

Following the outbreak of World War II, many members of the battalion volunteered for service with the Second Australian Imperial Force and were allocated to the 2/3rd Battalion, with whom they served in North Africa, Syria, Greece, Crete and then later in New Guinea. In 1942, following the entry of Japan into the war, the 3rd Battalion (The Werriwa Regiment) was mobilised and brought up to its full wartime establishment with national servicemen. In May 1942 the battalion was sent to Port Moresby, where it joined the rest of the 30th Brigade, to undertake garrison duties. In July the Japanese landed around Gona and as reinforcements were brought up from Australia, elements of the 30th Brigade began a number of delaying actions around Kokoda. In September 1942, the 3rd Battalion was sent up the Kokoda Trail, where it had the distinction of being one of only two militia units to fight alongside its associated AIF unit. Over the next couple of months it assisted in the recapturing of Kokoda, before participating in the fighting around Buna and Gona. In 1943, the battalion was withdrawn to Australia along with the rest of the 30th Brigade, where it was subsequently disbanded in July and its personnel absorbed into its associated AIF unit, the 2/3rd Battalion.

In 1948, the battalion was re-raised as part of the Citizens Military Force, based around Canberra. In 1960, when the Australian Army was reorganised along Pentropic lines, the battalion was reduced to a company-sized unit and formed 'C' Company, 3rd Battalion, Royal New South Wales Regiment (3 RNSWR). In 1965, this company was expanded to become a full battalion again when the Pentropic divisional structure was abandoned; however, in 1987, 3 RNSWR was amalgamated with 4 RNSWR to form the 4th/3rd Battalion, Royal New South Wales Regiment.

== History ==
=== World War I ===
Due to the provisions of the Defence Act 1903 which precluded sending conscripts overseas to fight, following the outbreak of World War I it was decided to raise an all volunteer force, outside of the already existing militia organisation, known as the Australian Imperial Force (AIF). Many members of the militia joined up and to a large extent, where possible, the AIF battalions were formed on a territorial basis, which meant that many of the AIF units were able to maintain the identity of their associated militia units. The 3rd Battalion, AIF, was raised soon after the declaration of war, and began concentrating at Randwick, drawing its recruits from the Werriwa area of New South Wales. The militia unit that was operating in the area at that time was the 43rd (Werriwa) Infantry Regiment, a regiment that could trace its lineage back to 1869.

After two months, during which time the battalion undertook a period of basic training, the 3rd Battalion departed Australia, proceeding to Egypt, where they arrived on 2 December 1914. After undertaking another period of training in Egypt, the battalion was employed in the defence of the Suez Canal, before being committed to the Gallipoli Campaign. On 25 April 1915, the 3rd Battalion took part in the landing at Anzac Cove, going ashore with the second and third waves. As a stalemate settled over the peninsula the battalion was involved in the defence of the beachhead, before taking part in the Battle of Lone Pine in August. It was during this battle, at Sasse's Sap, that Private John Hamilton, performed the deeds that led to him receiving the Victoria Cross. For the next four months the battalion remained at Gallipoli, before being evacuated along with the rest of the allied forces, in December 1915.

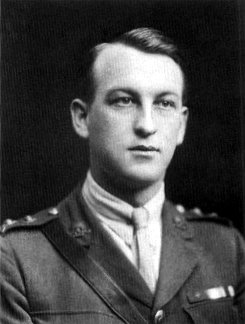
John Hamilton, the 3rd Battalion's sole Victoria Cross recipient from World War I.

After the withdrawal from Gallipoli, the battalion returned to Egypt where they were once again used in the defence of the Suez Canal against the Turks and the AIF undertook a period of reorganisation and expansion. In March 1916, the 3rd Battalion embarked for France, where for the next two and a half years it would serve in the trenches along the Western Front. Following a period of acclimatisation where the battalion undertook duties in a quiet sector of the line, in July 1916 the battalion took part in its first major action in Europe, during the Battle of Pozières. Later they took part in the fighting around Ypres in Belgium, before returning to the Somme to man the line during the winter. Throughout 1917, they were involved in operations against the Hindenburg Line, spending a majority of the year in the line near Ypres.

In 1918, the battalion was used to help stop the German spring offensive in March and April, before taking part in the final Allied offensive launched near Amiens on 8 August 1918, which ultimately brought an end to the war. As a part of this offensive, the 3rd Battalion continued operations until late September 1918, when they were withdrawn for rest and reorganisation. They were out of the line when the Armistice was declared on 11 November 1918 and following that the slow process of demobilisation and repatriation of men began. By May 1919, the majority of the battalion's personnel had been returned to Australia for discharge and the battalion was disbanded.

During the course of its involvement in the war, the 3rd Battalion suffered 3,598 casualties, of which 1,312 were killed in action. Members of the battalion received the following decorations: one Victoria Cross, three Companions of the Order of St Michael and St George, four Distinguished Service Orders, 28 Military Crosses, 34 Distinguished Conduct Medals, 92 Military Medals with three Bars, eight Meritorious Service Medals, 74 Mentions in Despatches. (Note: The unit also received six foreign awards, although the AWM source does not clarify what these awards were.)

=== Inter war years ===
During the war, while the units of the AIF had been overseas fighting in Europe and the Middle East, the militia units had remained in Australia on home service, providing security at ports, defence installations and other facilities of importance to the war effort. However, due to the large numbers of militiamen that volunteered for service with the AIF many of these units were greatly depleted and it was not until after the war, in 1919, that the compulsory training scheme began again. In 1921 the AIF was officially disbanded and the following month it was decided to reorganise the militia units and to redesignate them in order to perpetuate the identity of the AIF units that had fought in the war. As a result of this decision, and due to the links that the 3rd Battalion, AIF, had with the 43rd (Werriwa) Infantry Regiment, this unit was reformed and designated as the 3rd Battalion (The Werriwa Regiment) and inherited that unit's battle honours.

In 1929, the compulsory training scheme was suspended following the election of the Scullin Labor government. This, coupled with the economic hardships of the Great Depression and the general apathy towards defence matters in this time, meant that the unit's numbers fell rapidly and so, in 1930, the battalion was amalgamated with the 4th Battalion (Australian Rifles). These two units would remain linked until 1937, when they were delinked and the 3rd Battalion amalgamated with the 53rd Battalion (West Sydney Regiment), to form the 3rd/53rd Battalion (Werriwa and West Sydney Regiment). This did not last for very long, though, and shortly after the two units were delinked and the 3rd Battalion was assigned to the 14th Brigade, based around Goulburn with the 55th Battalion (New South Wales Rifle Regiment).

=== World War II ===
When World War II began it was again decided to form an all volunteer force for overseas service. Once again this force, known as the Second Australian Imperial Force, was raised outside of the already existing military forces of the militia and the government sought largely to prevent wholesale enlistment by members of the militia in the AIF as it was felt that there was a need to build up Australia's home defences due to the possibility of war with the Japanese. Nevertheless, large numbers of militiamen volunteered for service in the AIF. Once again there was an attempt to preserve the territorial identity of the militia units and as a result, many men from the 3rd Battalion (Werriwa Regiment) were allocated to the 2/3rd Battalion, which was raised at Ingleburn in October 1939. This unit would later go on to participate in the fighting in North Africa, Greece, Crete, Syria and then later in New Guinea.

Meanwhile, in January 1940, the compulsory training scheme which had been suspended since 1929 was reintroduced and units of the militia were progressively called up for periods of full-time training in order to boost their readiness. The 3rd Battalion's base from 1941 to 1942 was in the drill hall built in 1940 in Canberra, now the Drill Hall Gallery, owned by the Australian National University and heritage-listed in 2004.

In January 1942, following the Japanese attacks on Pearl Harbor and the British in Malaya, the situation in the Pacific worsened and many Australians began to worry about invasion. As a result of this many of the militia units were mobilised in this time and a number of them were sent to New Guinea to carry out defensive duties. (Note: The provisions of the Defence Act 1903 precluded sending conscripts overseas to fight, but as New Guinea was an Australian territory in 1942, it was technically not considered to be overseas within the definition of the Act. In 1943, the Defence (Citizen Military Forces) Act 1943 was introduced to expand the area in which militia units could be employed.) The 3rd Battalion was one of these and upon mobilisation it was brought up to its wartime establishment with a number of drafts of national servicemen recruited from regional New South Wales and the Australian Capital Territory.

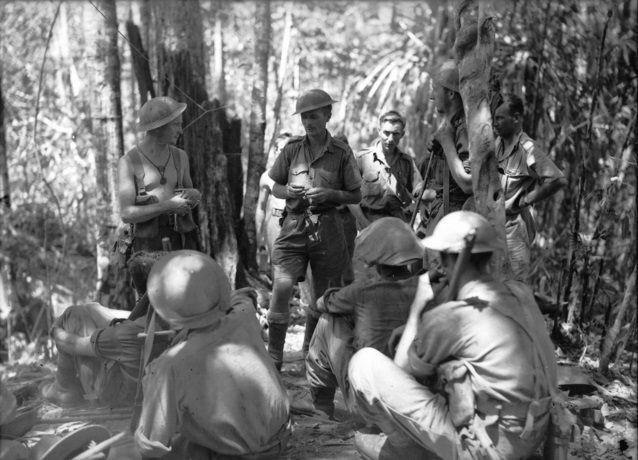
Lieutenant Colonel A.G. Cameron, commanding officer, delivering orders for a patrol around Menari, September 1942

The battalion began training in earnest near Maitland, New South Wales, before being sent along with the rest of the 14th Brigade to the coast to undertake defensive duties near Newcastle. In May they were relieved from these duties and returned to camp near Maitland, before going on leave prior to deployment overseas. By the end of the month the 3rd Battalion had arrived in Port Moresby where they began garrison duties as part of the 14th Brigade and alongside the 30th Brigade, which consisted of the 39th and 49th Battalions. In July the New Guinea campaign began when the Japanese landed troops near Buna and began to move inland. In an effort to delay their advance in time for reinforcements to arrive from Australia, elements of 39th Battalion began a series of delaying actions around Kokoda, while the 3rd Battalion remained in Port Moresby to defend the seaport. In early September, as reinforcements began to arrive, the battalion moved up the Kokoda Trail to Ioribaiwa, where they began patrolling operations under the command of the 21st Brigade in order to defend the village against advancing Japanese elements. Alongside the 2/6th Independent Company and the 2/14th and 2/16th Battalions, the 3rd Battalion helped hold the village for four days before falling back to Imita Ridge on 17 September. Soon after the Japanese, having reached the limit of their supply lines, began to withdraw and the 3rd Battalion subsequently participated in the advance back up the Kokoda Trail, carrying out patrolling operations as they re-occupied numerous villages that had been lost earlier in the campaign.

Late in October, after the Second Battle of Eora Creek – Templeton's Crossing, the battalion was withdrawn from the line for a brief period of rest at Myola, before assuming defensive responsibilities for Kokoda village on 3 November 1942. The battalion joined the Australian pursuit towards the Kumusi, taking part in the fighting around Oivi–Gorari before taking part in the fighting around Buna and Gona later in the month. Around this time, the battalion's machine gun company was detached and in conjunction with several other Militia machine gun companies, it was used to form the 7th Machine Gun Battalion.

In early 1943, the battalion was brought back to Australia for reorganisation. Based on the Atherton Tablelands in Queensland, the battalion was brought back up to establishment and the 30th Brigade was transferred to the 6th Division, with a view to participating in further operations in New Guinea. However, in July it was decided to disband the brigade, to provide reinforcements for the rest of the 6th Division. As a result of this, the battalion's personnel were reallocated according to their categories of service, with the national servicemen being absorbed into the 36th Battalion, while those that had volunteered for overseas service joined the survivors of the 2/22nd Battalion to form the 3rd/22nd Battalion. This was only short-lived, though, for later this unit was absorbed by the 2/3rd Battalion. Members of the battalion received the following decorations: one Distinguished Service Order, two Military Crosses and five Military Medals.

=== Post World War II ===
In 1948, the 3rd Battalion (Werriwa Regiment) was re-raised as part of the Citizens Military Force (CMF), which was the forerunner to the Australian Army Reserve that currently exists. This time the battalion was based around Canberra, with depots around regional New South Wales. As had been the case following World War I, it was decided that the units of the CMF would become the custodians of the battle honours earned by the AIF during World War II, and thus the battle honours of the 2/3rd Battalion were passed to the Werriwa Regiment. Between 1951 and 1960 a national service scheme operated and the battalion's numbers remained reasonably steady, however, in 1960 the scheme was suspended once more and the Australian Army was reorganised with the introduction of the Pentropic divisional structure. As a result of this the CMF was greatly reduced and fourteen infantry battalions were disbanded altogether, while many others were amalgamated into the battalions of the six State-based regiments. As a result of this, the 3rd Battalion was reduced to a company-sized element of the 3rd Battalion, Royal New South Wales Regiment, forming 'C' Company.

In 1965, the Australian Army abandoned the Pentropic divisional structure and in an attempt to restore some of the regional ties of the State-based regiments, a number of the regional companies of the State-based regiments were split and used to form new battalions with their traditional numerical designations. As a result, 'C' Company, 3 RNSWR was used to re-raise the 3rd Battalion in its own right. This unit would remain in existence until 1987, when further reforms to the Army Reserve led to a reduction in the number of infantry units across Australia and 3 RNSWR was amalgamated with 4 RNSWR to form the 4th/3rd Battalion, Royal New South Wales Regiment.

== Battle honours ==
The 3rd Battalion received the following battle honours:

- "Suakin 1885" (inherited);
- "South Africa 1899–1902" (inherited);
- World War I: Somme 1916, Somme 1918, Pozieres, Bullecourt, Ypres 1917, Menin Road, Polygon Wood, Broodseinde, Poelcappelle, Passchendaele, Lys, Hazebrouck, Amiens, Albert 1918 (Chuignes), Hindenburg Line, Hindenburg Line, Epehy, France and Flanders 1916–1918, ANZAC, Landing at ANZAC, Defence at ANZAC, Suvla, Sari Bair–Lone Pine.
- World War II: Ioribaiwa, Kokoda Trail, Eora Creek–Templeton's Crossing II, Oivi–Gorari, Buna–Gona, Gona, Liberation of Australian New Guinea. (Note: These battle honours are now held by 4/3 RNSWR.)

== Lineage ==
The 3rd Battalion's lineage can be traced as follows:

1869–1870 — Goulburn Volunteer Rifle Company
1870–1876 — The Western Battalion Volunteer Rifles
1876–1878 — The Western Rifle Regiment
1878–1883 — 3rd Admin Regiment New South Wales Volunteer Infantry, Western District
1883–1889 — 1st Regiment New South Wales Volunteer Infantry
1889–1901 — 2nd Regiment New South Wales Volunteer Infantry
1901–1903 — 2nd Infantry Regiment
1903–1908 — 2nd Australian Infantry Regiment
1908–1912 — 1st Battalion, 2nd Australian Infantry Regiment
1912–1914 — 43rd Infantry
1914–1918 — 43rd (Werriwa) Infantry
1918–1921 — 5th Battalion, 3rd Infantry Regiment
1921–1927 — 3rd Battalion
1927–1930 — 3rd Battalion (The Werriwa Regiment)
1930–1936 — 3rd/4th Battalion
1936–1937 — 53rd/3rd Battalion
1937–1943 — 3rd Battalion (The Werriwa Regiment)
1948–1960 — 3rd Battalion (The Werriwa Regiment)
1960–1965 — 'C' Coy, 3rd Battalion, Royal New South Wales Regiment
1965–1987 — 3rd Battalion, Royal New South Wales Regiment.
1987–current — 'C' (Werriwa) Company, 4th/3rd Battalion, Royal New South Wales Regiment

== See also ==
- Military history of Australia during World War I
- Military history of Australia during World War II

== Notes ==
Footnotes

Citations
