= Kōtoku Maru (1937) =

History
- Name: Kōtoku Maru
- Owner: Hiroumi Syozi Kabushiki Kaisha (1937); Imperial Japanese Navy (193?-1942)
- Builder: Mitsubishi Jūkōgyō Kabushiki-kaisha
- Laid down: 13 October 1936
- Launched: 30 January 1937
- Commissioned: requisitioned 19 September 1937
- Stricken: removed from Navy List 10 June 1943
- Fate: Sunk by Allied aircraft 8 August 1942

General characteristics
- Tonnage: 6,702 GRT
- Length: 486 feet (148 m)
- Beam: 58 feet (18 m)
- Draught: 32 feet (10 m)

The Kōtoku Maru was a 6,702 gross ton freighter that was built by Mitsubishi Jūkōgyō Kabushiki-kaisha, Nagasaki for Hiroumi Syozi Kabushiki Kaisha launched in 1937. She was requisitioned by the Imperial Japanese Navy and fitted out as an auxiliary ammunition ship.

She was part of the fleet that landed troops during the Hainan Island Operation on 9 February 1939. She was anchored at Cam Ranh Bay, French Indochina, with Imperial Japanese Navy forces in preparation for the Japanese invasion of Malaysia in December 1941. On 9 July 1942, she landed 250 members of the Hara Construction Force and security troops on Guadalcanal to help build Lunga Airfield, and then transported 50 more men to Gavutu to build installations.

Kōtoku Maru left Rabaul in a convoy to resupply Buna and Gona. Disembarkation of her embarked troops of the 15th Independent Engineer Regiment began near the village of Basabua on the afternoon of 29 July 1942. The ships of the convoy came under bombardment from eight United States Army Air Forces (USAAF) A-24 Banshees of the 3rd Bombardment Group from 7-Mile Drome near Port Moresby, New Guinea, escorted by USAAF P-39 Airacobras of the 41st Fighter Squadron and 80th Fighter Squadron at 1445. She took a bomb hit on her No. 5 hatch and began taking on water. She was able to disembark all of the embarked troops, but was unable to unload any of their equipment.

After heading back under her own power to Lae, she was quickly patched up to return the following day to offload the much-needed equipment. On 30 July, under the protection of the light cruiser Tatsuta and destroyer Yūzuki, she headed back to Buna at 1330. En route she was attacked by Allied aircraft at around 1515. Later she came under attack by eight B-17 Flying Fortresses of the USAAF 19th Bombardment Group and was hit by at least three 500-pound (227-kg) bombs at 1640 and was disabled. Her crew abandoned ship, and Tatsuta and Yūzuki rescued the survivors and steamed to Rabaul.

The unmanned Kōtoku Maru remained afloat and adrift and ran aground near Salamaua at 07°01′N 147°07′E. The Japanese undertook salvage on her wreck, removing some of her cargo. After the Allies occupied Salamaua, they salvaged winches and other gear from her wreck on 15 July 1944. The ship remained upright until sometime after 1945, when she rolled over onto her side.
