= 55th/53rd Battalion (Australia) =

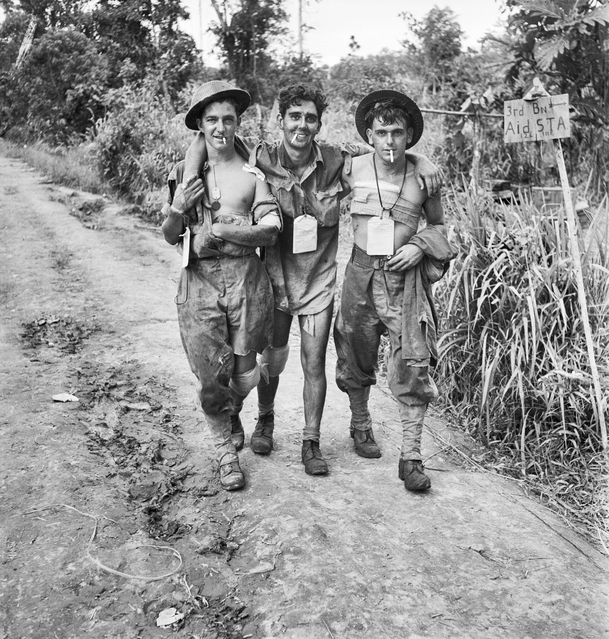
- Walking wounded from the 55th/53rd Battalion after an attack on 7 December 1942 around Sanananda
- Active: 1919; 1937–41; 1942–46
- Country: Australia
- Branch: Australian Army
- Type: Infantry
- Size: ~800–900 men all ranks (Note: By the start of World War II, the authorised strength of an Australian infantry battalion it was 910 men all ranks. However, following the adoption of the Jungle divisional organisation, it dropped to 803.)
- Part of: 30th Brigade; 14th Brigade; 11th Brigade
- Nickname: New South Wales Rifle/West Sydney Regiment
- Colours: Brown beside green
- Engagements: World War II: New Guinea campaign; Bougainville campaign

Insignia
- Unit colour patch

The 55th/53rd Battalion was an infantry battalion of the Australian Army which saw active service during World War II. First formed in 1919 during the demobilisation of the Australian Imperial Force, the battalion was an amalgamation of two other units, the 55th and 53rd Battalions. It was disbanded shortly afterwards and remained off the order of battle until 1937 when it was raised as a part-time unit of the Militia, based in Sydney. In 1941, with the expansion of the Australian Army in response to the growing threat of war in the Pacific, the battalion was split and the 55th and 53rd Battalions reformed separately. In late 1942, however, they were amalgamated once more and together went on to participate in the fighting against the Japanese in New Guinea and on Bougainville.

== History ==
The 55th/53rd Battalion was formed briefly in 1919 in Belgium following the cessation of hostilities through the amalgamation of the 55th and 53rd Battalions as men were transferred out of these units as part of the demobilisation of the Australian Imperial Force. As this process reached completion, however, the battalion was disbanded shortly afterwards. In 1921, both the 55th and 53rd Battalions were re-raised as part of the Citizen Forces, in the Sydney, region part of a reorganisation of Australia's part-time military forces.

The economic hardships of the 1930s and the suspension of the compulsory training scheme meant that training opportunities were limited during this time and there were few volunteers. As a result, a number of battalions were amalgamated as numbers dropped. The 55th and 53rd remained on the order of battle as separate units until 1937 when they were amalgamated once more, adopting the combined territorial designation of the "New South Wales Rifle/West Sydney Regiment".

Following the outbreak of World War II, they remained in existence until October 1941 when the 55th and 53rd were delinked once more and the two battalions took part in the Kokoda Track campaign separately. During this time the 55th had developed a good reputation for itself, however, the 53rd had been poorly prepared for the desperate situation that the Australians were facing around Kokoda and it had not performed so well. In October 1942 it was decided to re-amalgamate the 55th and 53rd and the 55th/53rd was reformed. Attached to the 30th Brigade, it went on to successfully take part in the fighting around Sanananda in 1942–43.

In early December 1942, the 55th/53rd were sent to the Sanananda Track, having marched from Popondetta. On 7 December the battalion dispatched a single company, 'B' Company, to launch a diversionary attack, while the rest of the battalion supported the 49th Battalion's attack at Sanananda. Coming up against strong defensive positions, the Australians were beaten back and the 55th/53rd suffered 130 casualties. For the next week they probed the Japanese perimeter before launching a second attack on 19 December, which saw them suffer a further 108 casualties. Further probes were undertaken until 26 December when the 55th/53rd – now a part of the 14th Brigade – followed up an unsuccessful attack by the 36th Battalion. Early the following month, the battalion was moved back to Gona, where they remained until they were returned to Australia in March 1943 on the troopship Duntroon.

Landing in Cairns, Queensland, the battalion was sent to Ravenshoe for leave before reforming around Townsville in April. While there, the 55th/53rd were transferred first to the 12th and then the 3rd Brigade, with whom it undertook garrison duty around Townsville. It was later transferred to the 11th Brigade and, despite being a Militia battalion, it eventually achieved AIF status, which meant that it could be deployed to fight in any theatre of war. (Note: Essentially this meant that because more than 65% of its establishment volunteered for overseas service, the battalion could be sent to fight anywhere, rather than just within the definition of Australian territory set out in the Defence Act 1903.) In December 1944, the battalion was sent to Boungainville where it took part in the fighting throughout 1945 as part of the 11th Brigade. During this time it undertook patrol operations in the Central and Northern Sectors of the island and although it experienced several contacts with the Japanese, it fought no major battles against them before it was withdrawn to the main Australian base around Torokina in May, where it remained until the war came to an end. It was during the period of demobilisation that Francis Donovan served as the battalion's adjutant.

Following the end of hostilities in August 1945 they undertook garrison duties in Rabaul until mid-1946, when the battalion was repatriated to Australia and disbanded. During its involvement in the war, the battalion lost 135 men killed or died of wounds, and 197 wounded. Men from the 55th/53rd received the following decorations: one Military Cross, one Distinguished Conduct Medal, four Military Medals and 12 Mentions in Despatches.

== Battle honours ==
The 55th/53rd Battalion received four battle honours:

- South-West Pacific 1942–1945, Buna–Gona, Sanananda Road, Liberation of Australian New Guinea.

== Notes ==
Footnotes

Citations
