= Ralph Honner =

Australian Army officer

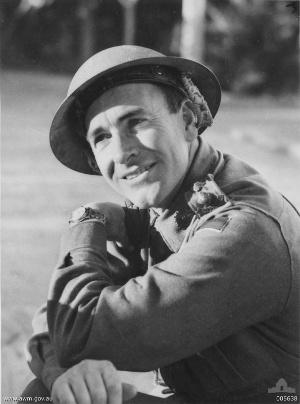
- Captain Ralph Honner in Libya, 1941.
- Born: 17 August 1904; Fremantle, Western Australia
- Died: 14 May 1994 (aged 89) (Note: Dennis et al and Brune list Honner's date of death as 14 May 1994, but the Australian War Memorial lists it as 15 May 1994.); Sydney, New South Wales
- Military career
- Allegiance: Australia
- Branch: Australian Army
- Service years: 1924–1927; 1936–1945
- Rank: Lieutenant Colonel
- Nickname: "Jump"
- Commands: 2/14th Battalion (1943); 39th Battalion (1942–43)
- Conflicts: Second World War; Western Desert campaign; Battle of Greece; Battle of Crete; South West Pacific theatre; Kokoda Track Campaign; Battle of Buna-Gona; Ramu and Markham Valley campaign
- Awards: Distinguished Service Order; Military Cross
- Other work: Ambassador to Ireland (1968–72)

Lieutenant Colonel Hyacinth Ralph Honner DSO, MC (17 August 1904 – 14 May 1994), known as Ralph Honner, was a distinguished Australian soldier during the Second World War. He is considered particularly notable for his leadership during the Kokoda Track Campaign, during which he commanded the 39th Battalion, which fought a series of delaying actions as the Japanese advanced towards Port Moresby. In 1943 Honner was wounded during the fighting in the Ramu and Markham Valleys and, as a result, was discharged from the Army in early 1945. In his later life, he worked as an administrator on the War Pensions Assessment Appeal Tribunal. He was also President of the Liberal Party of Australia (New South Wales Division) from 1961 to 1963, and served as the Australian ambassador to Ireland between 1969 and 1972. He died in 1994, aged 89.

== Early life ==
Honner was born the third child of six in Fremantle, Western Australia, on 17 August 1904. His parents were Richard and Eleanor Honner. His father was a police officer and the family were devout Catholics. At birth, Honner's full name was Hyacinth Ralph Honner, with his first name being derived from Saint Hyacinth, whose feast day was 17 August, however, growing up, this name caused Honner some heartache as he was sometimes mistaken for being female on paperwork and during his formative years at school he informally began using his middle name instead.

In 1917, Honner attended Perth Boys School before receiving a scholarship to Perth Modern School, where he started in the beginning of 1918 as a boarder. In his early teens Honner was quiet and was considered small and not very athletic by his peers. He was intensely bright, however, and did well in his studies. By his final year of school, however, he had filled out from working on his family's property at Cheltenham Park, and had grown to 6 feet (1.8 m); he had also become an "accomplished athlete". At the age of 18, in 1923, having completed his schooling, Honner enrolled at Claremont Teachers College and began a Bachelor of Arts at the University of Western Australia, majoring in the English and Modern History.

While he was studying, he met Marjory Collier Bennett, who was also studying to become a teacher, and in 1925 they became "unofficially engaged". Lacking the money with which to get married, they would remain engaged for nine years before eventually marrying on 2 June 1934 at Nedlands, Western Australia. They would subsequently have four children together: Richard (1936), Brian (1938), Margaret (1943) and John (1946). During this time, Honner also served in the Citizens Forces, joining the 11th/16th Battalion in 1924 and achieving the rank of sergeant by 1927 when he took his discharge.

In 1927 Honner completed his teaching qualification and began working in Kalgoorlie. Two years later he was offered a position as Senior House Master at Hale School in Perth. Taking the position, he undertook classes at night at the University of Western Australia to obtain a law degree, which was conferred upon him in 1933. During this time he also played the occasional game for Claremont in the West Australian Football League, as well as playing rugby union and representing the university in athletics.

Upon completing his law degree, Honner went to work at the Parker and Parker law firm in Perth. He also continued his sporting interests and in 1936 rejoined the part-time military forces, which was then known as the Militia. On 25 June 1936 he was appointed as a lieutenant in the 11th/16th Battalion.

== Second World War ==
Following the outbreak of the Second World War, Honner enlisted in the Second Australian Imperial Force (2nd AIF) on 24 October 1939. In December 1939 he took command of 'C' Company of the 2/11th Battalion, a Western Australian infantry battalion, with the rank of captain. Honner and his battalion sailed for the Middle East in April 1940, arriving the following month. After undertaking training in Palestine, Honner's company then proceeded to fight in the battles of the Western Desert campaign against the Italians at Bardia, Tobruk and Derna before being dispatched to Greece following the German invasion in April 1941. In Greece, Honner led his men through a series of fighting withdrawals as they were pushed back by stronger German forces. Later they were evacuated to Crete where they took part in the heavy fighting around Retimo. Honner then led a group across the island in order to evade capture and, after meeting up with a Royal Navy submarine, they were evacuated to Alexandria. He was subsequently promoted to major and, for his leadership during the fighting around Thermopylae in the earlier Greek campaign, he was awarded the Military Cross.

Following this Honner undertook a training role, serving as commanding officer of an Australian training battalion in the Middle East, to which he was posted in October 1941. Honner returned to Australia in May 1942. After being briefly reunited with his wife he was promoted to lieutenant colonel and sent to Papua where he was given command of the 39th Battalion, who were involved in a desperate campaign against the Japanese forces fighting along the Kokoda Track. With instructions to stop the Japanese advance at Isurava, Honner arrived on 16 August 1942. Upon reaching the battalion's position, Honner found that his new command was already depleted from tropical diseases and from earlier fighting and was heavily outnumbered.

Using his previous combat experience and personal leadership qualities, Honner maintained the 39th Battalion's cohesion and morale, and led them in a fighting withdrawal down the track, helping to blunt the Japanese advance towards Port Moresby until they were reinforced, and subsequently relieved, by the 2/14th Battalion. The 39th Battalion was then withdrawn from the line and rested for a brief period of time before they were recommitted to the fighting around Gona in December 1942. For his role during the capture of the Japanese beachheads around Gona and Sananada, Honner was later awarded the Distinguished Service Order. In January 1943, the 39th Battalion was withdrawn to Australia for rest and re-organisation. After reforming on the Atherton Tablelands in Queensland, they were subsequently disbanded on 3 July 1943, as the decision was made to redistribute the battalion's personnel to reinforce other units.

Although Honner took the decision to disband the 39th Battalion hard, six days after he was appointed to command of the 2/14th Battalion, having been asked for personally by Brigadier Ivan Dougherty, commander of the 21st Brigade of which the 2/14th was a part. Honner subsequently led the 2/14th early in the campaign in the Ramu–Markham Valley before being seriously wounded by a gunshot to his hip after leaving the battalion's main defensive perimeter to conduct a reconnaissance during the advance on Dumpu. After being evacuated to Australia, Honner had surgery on his hip during which a metal plate was inserted into it. In early 1944, after being deemed only fit for duties of an administrative nature, he was posted as General Staff Officer Grade 1, Directorate of Military Training, G Branch, at Land Headquarters in Melbourne, where he worked on the creation of training manuals. In late 1944 Honner's medical classification was downgraded further as his hip injury worsened, and as a result in January 1945, he was discharged.

== Later life ==
Following his discharge from the Army, Honner took a position as chairman of the No. 3 War Pensions Assessment Appeal Tribunal in Perth, where he heard appeals by veterans in relation to pension claims. In 1949, Honner moved to Sydney with his family, taking up residence at Seaforth and after this he assumed the chair of the No. 2 War Pension Assessment Appeal Tribunal, undertaking the same duties as he had in Perth. In Sydney, Honner became involved with the United Nations Association (New South Wales Division) and between 1955 and 1957 he served as the association's president. Between 1961 and 1963, he also served as President of the Liberal Party of Australia (New South Wales Division). He was the first Catholic to undertake the role.

Honner retired from the pensions tribunal in 1968, and later that year he was appointed as the second Australian ambassador to Ireland. Based in Dublin, he served in this post from October 1969 until January 1972 when he returned to Sydney and established himself at Beauty Point. After his wife, Marjory, became sick, Honner spent most of his time taking care of her until she died in 1990. Ralph Honner subsequently died at his home in Sydney on 14 May 1994, aged 89 years. His funeral was held on 20 May at St Mary's Church, North Sydney. At his funeral an unknown Japanese veteran walked up to his coffin and bowed in respect. Honner was buried alongside his wife at the Northern Suburbs Cemetery.

== Notes ==
Footnotes

Citations

Diplomatic posts
Preceded by K. I. Gates as Chargé d'affaires	Australian ambassador to Ireland; 1969–1972	Succeeded by Keith Brennan
