= Ayatosan Maru =

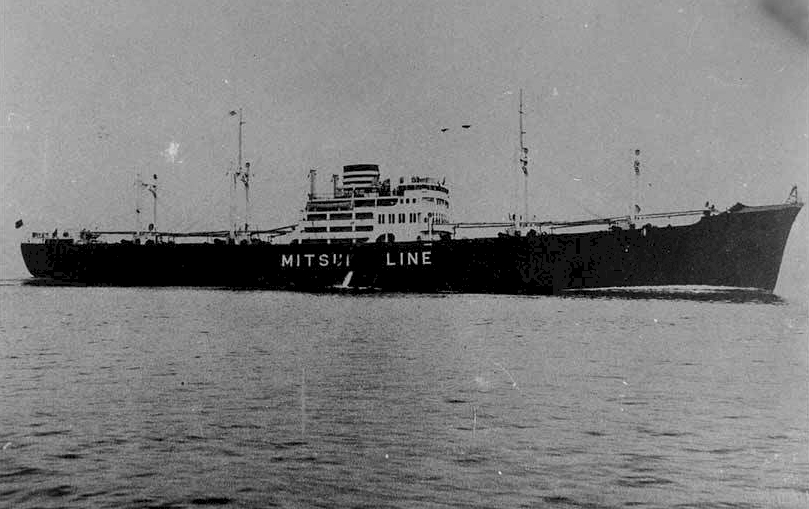
- Awazisan Maru, almost identical to Ayatosan Maru

History

Empire of Japan
- Name: Ayatosan Maru
- Owner: Mitsui & Co. Ltd. (1941)
- Builder: Tama Zosensho
- Yard number: 246
- Laid down: 13 June 1938
- Launched: 28 September 1939
- Completed: 24 February 1941
- Home port: Kobe
- Identification: Call sign JXUM
- Fate: Requisitioned by Imperial Japanese Army

Empire of Japan
- Name: Ayatosan Maru
- Operator: Imperial Japanese Army
- Fate: Sunk, 21 July 1942

General characteristics
- Tonnage: 9,788 GRT; 10,930 DWT
- Length: 145 m (476 ft)
- Beam: 20 m (64 ft)
- Draught: 12 m (40 ft)

Ayatosan Maru (綾戸山丸 貨物船) was a 9,788 gross register tons (GRT), 10,930 tons deadweight (DWT) freighter that was built by Tama Shipbuilding Co., Tamano for Mitsui & Co. Ltd. launched in 1939. She had been intended to run the New York passenger and freight run, however, she was requisitioned by the Imperial Japanese Navy and fitted out as a high-speed transport, which was completed in May 1941.

During the invasion of Malaya she was damaged by Royal Australian Air Force Lockheed Hudson light bombers and a blaze broke out which was later extinguished. She was also damaged by a torpedo from the Dutch submarine HNLMS O 16.

While unloading troops and supplies at Gona on 21 July 1942, she was bombed by United States Army Air Forces and Royal Australian Air Force bombers and was sunk at 8°50′S 148°50′E, with the loss of forty lives and three vehicles. Two other transports that had completed unloading escaped with their escort. She became known as "The Gona wreck" with allied patrols investigating and confirming the ship's identity. The wreck was later used to range artillery and as a bombing target by Allied forces.
