= William T. Owen =

Australian Army officer

William Taylor Owen
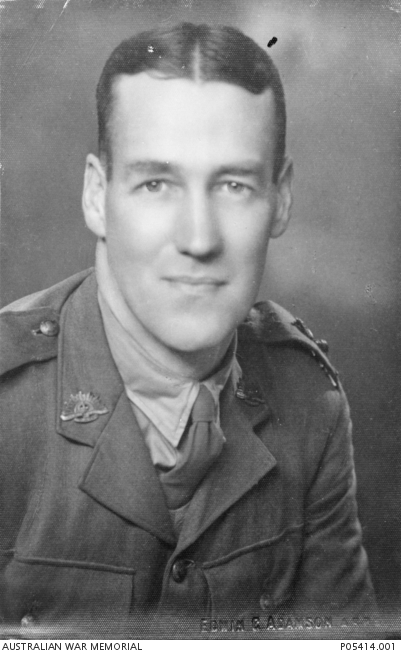
- Lieutenant Colonel Owen c. 1940
- Born: 27 May 1905; Nagambie, Victoria, Australia
- Died: 29 July 1942 (aged 37) †; Kokoda, New Guinea
- Burial place: Bomana War Cemetery
- Military career
- Allegiance: Australia
- Branch: Citizen Military Forces (1933–40); Second Australian Imperial Force (1940–42)
- Service years: c. 1933–1942
- Rank: Lieutenant Colonel
- Service number: VX45223
- Commands: 39th Battalion (1942)
- Conflicts: Second World War; New Guinea campaign; Battle of Rabaul; Kokoda Track campaign; Battle of Kokoda (DOW)
- Awards: Mentioned in Despatches; Distinguished Service Cross (United States)

Lieutenant Colonel William Taylor Owen (27 May 1905 – 29 July 1942) was an Australian Army officer who served during the Second World War. A survivor of the Battle of Rabaul, he was killed in action leading the 39th Battalion during the Kokoda Track campaign.

== Early life ==
Owen was born on 27 May 1905, in Nagambie, Victoria. He worked as a bank officer in civilian life and served as a militia officer in the years prior to the outbreak of the Second World War.

== Military career ==
Owen enlisted in the Australian Imperial Force (AIF) on 8 July 1940, with the service number VX45223. He was posted to the 2/22nd Infantry Battalion, with the rank of major, in command of 'A' Company.

=== Battle of Rabaul ===
The 2/22nd Infantry Battalion was sent to the town of Rabaul, on the island of New Britain, in early 1941. This was the closest Australian base to the Japanese, and considered unlikely to be successfully defended. In late January 1942, the 1,400-strong Rabaul (Australian) garrison was quickly overwhelmed by the Japanese. Owen's 'A' Company was positioned at Vulcan beach, and bore the brunt of the main Japanese landing. After fighting for several hours, Owen ordered his men to break contact, as they would otherwise have been cut off.

With the remainder of the Australian garrison, Owen and his men escaped from Rabaul. They faced a harrowing battle for survival in the mountains and along the southern coast. More than 150 men were massacred after being taken prisoner around Tol and Waitavalo plantations, up to 100 others died of illnesses, and about 800 surrendered and were taken back to Rabaul by the Japanese. Owen was one of only 400 to get off New Britain. He arrived in Port Moresby and after a period of recuperation in Australia was promoted to lieutenant colonel and assumed command of the 39th Battalion on 7 July 1942.

=== Kokoda Track Campaign ===
The 39th Battalion was preparing for deployment to the mountain village of Kokoda, as the first step in an Allied plan to occupy the north coast of Papua. The first troops departed the day after Owen assumed command. After the Japanese landed on the north coast on 21 July, Owen was flown up to Kokoda, from where 'B' Company was already engaging the enemy. Facing overwhelming odds, the Australians were pushed back. Owen ordered the burning of the supply dump at Kokoda and a retreat to Deniki. After realising the Japanese had not occupied Kokoda, he led his men back into the village in an attempt to reopen its airfield to receive reinforcements and supplies. The aircraft dispatched to Kokoda were not able to land. The Japanese started attacking in force on the evening of 28 July.

Owen was mortally wounded at 0300 hrs on the morning of 29 July 1942, as the Japanese stepped up their attacks on the dug-in Australians. He was shot just above the right eye while in his forward weapon pit. Taken back to a hut that was being used as an aid post, he was examined by the medical officer, Captain Geoffrey 'Doc' Vernon. His situation was deemed hopeless and when the Australians were forced to withdraw from their location at 0430 hrs, Owen could not be moved. He was cleaned up and left as comfortable as possible.

On 9 August, Owen's body was found and buried at Kokoda by members of 'A' Company, 39th Battalion, when they retook Kokoda for a short period between 8 and 10 August 1942. Later in the war, the temporary Australian war graves at the various battle sites along the Kokoda Track were consolidated at Bomana, north-west of Port Moresby. As a part of this, Owen's body was reburied. He posthumously received the United States Distinguished Service Cross and was Mentioned in Despatches.

== Bomana War Cemetery Gravestone inscription ==
OWEN, Lieutenant Colonel, WILLIAM TAYLOR, VX45223. A.I.F. 39 Bn. Australian Infantry. 29 July 1942. Age 37. Son of William and Ida Owen; husband of Daisy Owen, of Kew, Victoria. C6. E. 4.
