= Gona, Papua New Guinea =

Village in Oro Province, Papua New Guinea

Coordinates: 8°36′S 148°16′E

Gona is a coastal village in Oro Province, Papua New Guinea.

== History ==
Gona was the site of an Anglican church and mission.

During World War II, Imperial Japanese troops invaded on 21–27 July 1942 and established it as a base. Three missionaries were captured at Gona; Father James Benson, May Hayman and Mavis Parkins. The two women and a six-year-old boy were beheaded on the beach. Father Benson was reported killed but taken prisoner and sent to Rabaul where he remained until the end of the war in 1945.

The Ayatosan Maru was sunk by United States Army Air Forces and Royal Australian Air Force bombers in shallow water off Gona on 21 July 1942. It later became known as the Gona wreck.

Gona was recaptured by the Australian Army during the battle of Buna-Gona on 9 December 1942.

== See also ==
- Invasion of Buna–Gona
