= 21st Brigade (Australia) =

Infantry brigade of the Australian Army during World War II

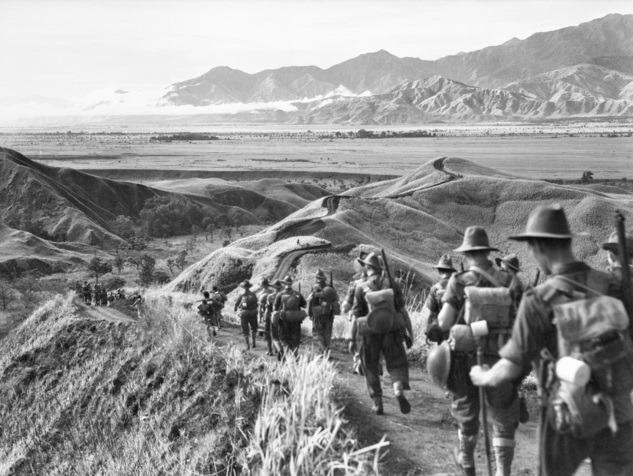
- 21st Brigade troops moving down from the Finisterre Range into the Ramu Valley in November 1943
- Active: 1912–1921; 1940–1946
- Country: Australia
- Branch: Australian Army
- Type: Infantry
- Size: ~2,500–3,500 personnel
- Part of: 7th Division
- Engagements: World War II: Syria-Lebanon campaign; New Guinea campaign; Battle of Balikpapan (1945)

Commanders
- Notable commanders: Jack Stevens; Arnold Potts; Ivan Dougherty

Insignia
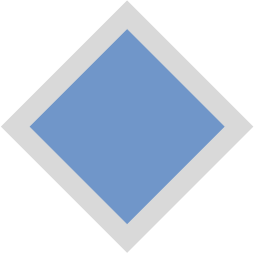
- Headquarters unit colour patch

The 21st Brigade was a brigade-sized infantry unit of the Australian Army. It was briefly raised in 1912 as a Militia formation providing training as part of the compulsory training scheme. Later, it was re-formed in April 1940 as part of the Second Australian Imperial Force, the unit was raised for service during World War II. As part of the 7th Division the brigade's constituent units were raised from volunteers from several Australian states. After rudimentary training in Australia, the brigade deployed for the Middle East in October 1940. Defensive duties were mounted along the Libyan border in early 1941, before the brigade was committed to the Syria-Lebanon campaign, fighting against Vichy French forces. In early 1942, following Japan's entry into the war, the brigade returned to Australia. After a period of defensive duties in Australia, it was deployed to New Guinea and subsequently played a key role in the Kokoda Track campaign, delaying the Japanese advance towards Port Moresby and then joining the pursuit as the Japanese withdrew towards Buna–Gona. In 1943–1944, the brigade took part in the capture of Lae and the Ramu Valley–Finisterre Range campaign. Its final campaign of the war, came in the final months when it took part in the Balikpapan landings. It was disbanded in 1946.

== History ==
=== Formation ===
The 21st Brigade briefly existed as Militia brigade that was partially formed in 1912, following the introduction of the compulsory training scheme. At this time, it was assigned to the 5th Military District. The brigade's constituent units were spread across various locations in Western Australia including Kalgoorlie, Leonora, Boulder, Coolgardie, Albany, Wagin and Northam. The brigade consisted of only three infantry battalions, instead of the four that was usual at the time. These were consecutively designated as the 83rd, 84th and 85th Infantry Battalions. The formation was short lived, and was not raised as part of the First Australian Imperial Force (AIF) during the First World War. It remained on the order of battle as a Militia formation during the war, but was not re-raised in the interwar years when the Militia was reorganised to replicate the numerical designations of the AIF in 1921.

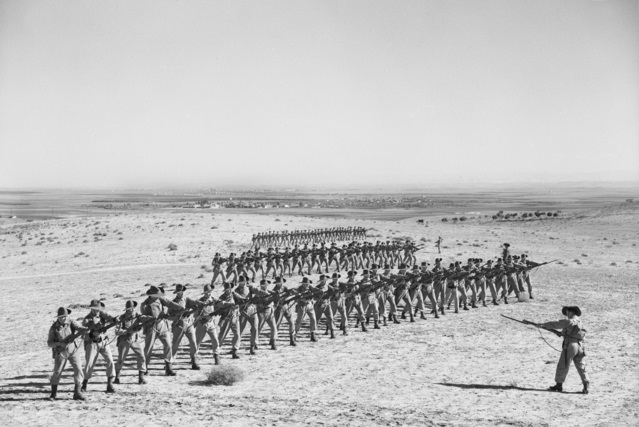
2/27th Battalion at bayonet practice in Palestine, December 1940

The brigade was re-formed on 4 April 1940 as part of the 7th Division of the Second Australian Imperial Force (2nd AIF). Upon establishment, the brigade opened its headquarters in May 1940, in Melbourne, Victoria. Consisting of three infantry battalions—the 2/14th, 2/16th and 2/27th—the brigade was raised from personnel drawn from Victoria, Western Australia and South Australia. Following a brief period of rudimentary training in home locations in Australia, under the command of Brigadier Jack Stevens, the brigade embarked for the Middle East in October 1940 aboard the Aquitania.

Sailing via India, after a brief stay at Deolali, near Bombay, where the brigade's three infantry battalions concentrated for the first time, the brigade continued on to the Middle East. Following their arrival in Egypt, the brigade moved to Dimra in the Hebron Hills in Palestine, where they undertook further training as the 7th Division underwent a period of re-organisation as a number of brigades were transferred to and from it. In April 1941, the brigade went to Egypt, stationed at Ikingi Maryut where the 7th Division began preparations to deploy to Greece where they were to reinforce the 6th Division. These plans were changed shortly afterwards, though, and the brigade was moved to Mersa Matruh on the Libyan border to defend against an expected German attack. After being relieved at Mersa Matruh, the brigade returned to Palestine in May, in order to prepare for operations elsewhere in the theatre.

=== Syria and Lebanon ===
In June and July 1941, the brigade was allocated to form the backbone of the Allied invasion of Lebanon and Syria, which saw British, Indian and Free French forces defeat Vichy French land forces in the Middle East. On 8 June, the 21st Brigade began its advance along the coast from Tyre, over the Litani towards Sidon, which was captured on 15 June. Following this, the Vichy French launched a counterattack which stalled the Australians' advance until 30 June when they were able to seize the initiative again. The 21st Brigade then drove towards Damour. On 6 July, the 2/16th Battalion attacked the main Vichy defensive position on El Atiqa Ridge, launching a frontal assault on a force of French Foreign Legion troops. Meanwhile, the 2/27th Battalion began opening a gap in the front, while the 2/14th approached Damour from its eastern approaches. On 7 July, the 2/27th Battalion was subjected to a strong French counterattack on Hill 560 which resulted in heavy casualties for the Australians before the French were ejected from the hill early in the morning the following day. On 9 July Damour fell and subsequently the 2/14th and 2/27th Battalions advanced through the mountains beyond.

By mid-July an armistice came into effect and the 21st Brigade subsequently undertook garrison duties along the coast. In December 1941 Imperial Japanese forces advanced rapidly in South East Asia following the attack on Pearl Harbor and the invasion of Malaya. As a result, in January 1942, the British government requested that the 7th Division be brought back from the Middle East to conduct operations in the Netherlands East Indies. From 30 January, the division, including the 21st Brigade, began disembarking from Suez. In February 1942, however, as the situation in the Pacific worsened, the Australian government decided that the division should be brought back to Australia rather than be committed to the fighting in Java, or in Burma.

=== New Guinea ===
In March 1942, the 21st Brigade arrived back in Australia, landing in Adelaide. After a period of leave, the brigade was reconstituted and moved to northern New South Wales and then Queensland where they undertook a defensive role around Caloundra in case of a Japanese invasion. As the situation in New Guinea worsened, the brigade was hastily deployed there in August 1942. Under the command of Brigadier Arnold Potts, who had taken over from Stevens in April, they were sent to Port Moresby from where they reinforced the militiamen of the 39th Battalion, fighting a rearguard action on the Kokoda Track. Throughout late August and into September the brigade fought a number of delaying actions along the track, initially around Isurava, but as the Japanese advance towards Port Moresby continued they were pushed back to Ioribaiwa. In mid-September, as the brigade prepared to make its final stand on Imita Ridge, they were relieved by the 25th Brigade and subsequently withdrawn back to Sogeri, near Port Moresby, in early October. During this time, a force of about 400 men from the brigade's three infantry battalions were grouped together into an ad hoc force known as "Chaforce" to conduct raids on Japanese lines of communication and to carry out various tasks such as battlefield clearance. Throughout their involvement around Kokoda, the brigade suffered 233 men killed, and although at the time there were questions raised in the upper echelons of the Australian Army about the brigade's performance, particularly from General Thomas Blamey, later this assessment was re-evaluated and the 21st Brigade's effort has since been described as "one of the greatest in Australian military history".

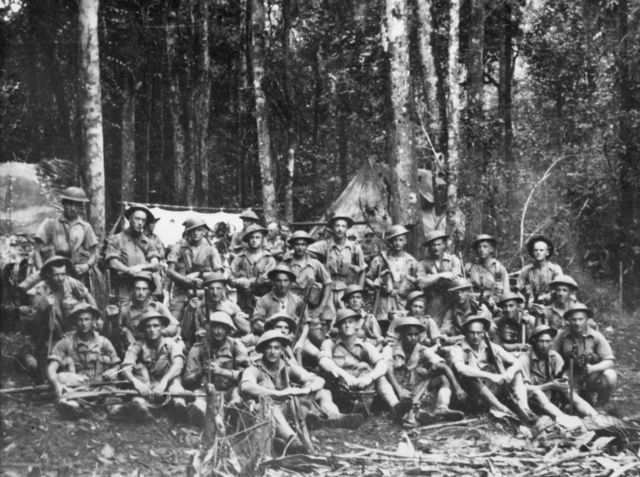
Men from 9 Platoon, 'A' Company, 2/14th Battalion at Kokoda on 16 August 1942

In late November, the brigade, under the command of Brigadier Ivan Dougherty who had replaced Potts in controversial circumstances following the withdrawal from Kokoda, was committed to the fighting around Gona. The 2/14th Battalion, consisting of only 350 men, arrived at Popondetta in the evening of 25 November and began the advance towards Gona at dawn the following day. They were followed shortly afterwards by the 2/27th, while the 2/16th arrived a little while later, after the two battalions had launched an attack around Basabua on 29 November. Further engagements followed on 30 November when clearing operations were undertaken between Basabua and Gona and on 1 December the brigade, operating as a composite battalion due to heavy casualties, attacked Gona itself. They were able to enter the village and remained for a short period of time before being forced out by a Japanese counterattack. Another unsuccessful attack was launched on 6 December. On 8 December, however, supported by a heavy artillery barrage, the 21st Brigade attacked the village from the west while the 39th Battalion attacked from the south-east. This time the attack was successful and Gona was captured with the last Japanese resistance being overcome the following afternoon amidst fierce hand-to-hand fighting. The brigade had suffered heavily over the previous 11 days, with 750 Australians being killed or wounded. Following this, the 21st Brigade headquarters moved to the Huggins Road Block area while its three infantry battalions, which had all been reduced to below company-strength due to losses, began the process of "mopping up" around the coast to the west of Gona.

In mid-January 1943, the brigade was withdrawn back to Australia, where they were subsequently re-organised under the "jungle" divisional establishment, which saw a reduction in the brigade's personnel. By that time the brigade was down to about 44 per cent of its authorised "jungle" establishment of 119 officers and 2,415 other ranks, and subsequently it underwent a period of rebuilding around Ravenshoe, in Queensland in preparation for further operations. In August the 21st Brigade embarked for Port Moresby, and on 15–16 September the brigade headquarters, along with the 2/14th and 2/16th Battalions, was flown into Nadzab, west of Lae to relieve the US Army's 503rd Parachute Infantry Regiment. After the fall of Lae, the brigade advanced up the Markham and Ramu Valleys, before moving against the Japanese strongholds in the Finisterre Range. The 21st Brigade remained in the Ramu Valley for about three and a half months, before being withdrawn in January 1944, by which time they had lost 57 men killed or missing and 142 men wounded. On top of this they suffered 2,436 non battle casualties, although most of these men returned to active service later on.

=== Borneo ===
After returning to Australia in 1944, the brigade retrained in north Queensland and practised amphibious assault operations. In July 1945, the brigade participated in the amphibious assault on Balikpapan, Sarawak. Coming ashore on 1 July, the brigade was committed to the first wave of the assault, landing unopposed. Supported by 'B' Company, 2/1st Machine Gun Battalion, the 21st Brigade quickly reached their initial objectives and the following day began to advance towards the east, arriving at the airfield at Sepinggang before noon on 2 July. On the third day of the fighting, the 21st Brigade came up against determined Japanese resistance after crossing the Batakan Ketjil river but this was overcome in the afternoon following a naval barrage.

The next day they resumed their advance to the east but were subsequently engaged and held up by Japanese coastal defence artillery near the Manggar Besar river. Following this, as armoured support was brought up and naval and aerial bombardment was used to reduce the Japanese position, one of the guns was captured on 6 July. Over the course of the following three days the brigade turned back a number of Japanese counterattacks. By 9 July, following further bombardment, the Japanese resistance around the position was overcome and the brigade subsequently captured Sambodja, 18 miles (29 km) from Manggar, before sending out patrols in support of the 25th Brigade which was beginning the advance up the Milford Highway. By the night of 21/22 July main combat operations around Balikpapan came to an end as organised Japanese resistance ceased. Patrol operations continued, however, and minor engagements were fought until the war ended in August. After the Japanese surrender, the 21st Brigade carried out occupation duties in the southern Celebes as "Macassar Force", until civilian administration was restored. The brigade was disbanded during 1946.

== Assigned units ==
The following infantry battalions were assigned to the 21st Brigade:

- 2/14th Battalion;
- 2/16th Battalion;
- 2/27th Battalion.

== Commanding officers ==
The following officers served as commanding officer of the 21st Brigade:

- Brigadier Jack Stevens (1940–1942);
- Brigadier Arnold Potts (1942);
- Brigadier Ivan Dougherty (1942–1945).
