= Kokoda Track campaign order of battle =

This is an order of battle listing the Australian and Japanese forces involved in the Kokoda Track campaign from 21 July – 16 November 1942.

== Australian forces ==
- New Guinea Force (Port Moresby) – Major General Basil Morris (19 May 1941 – 31 July 1942) / Lieutenant General Sydney Rowell (1 August 1942 – 30 September 1942) / Lieutenant General Edmund Herring (1 October 1942 – 29 January 1943)
  - 7th Division – Major General Arthur Allen (18 April 1941 – 14 November 1942) / Major General Alan Vasey (temporary) (14 November 1942 – 23 February 1943)
    - 16th Brigade – Brigadier John Lloyd
      - 2/1st Battalion
      - 2/2nd Battalion
      - 2/3rd Battalion
    - 21st Brigade – Brigadier Arnold Potts / Brigadier Ivan Dougherty
      - 2/14th Battalion
      - 2/16th Battalion
      - 2/27th Battalion
    - 25th Brigade – Brigadier Kenneth Eather
      - 2/25th Battalion
      - 2/31st Battalion
      - 2/33rd Battalion
    - 30th Brigade – Brigadier Selwyn Porter
      - 39th Battalion
      - 53rd Battalion
  - 3rd Battalion
  - 2/1st Pioneer Battalion
  - 2/6th Independent Company
  - Papuan Infantry Battalion
  - 14th Field Regiment, Royal Australian Artillery
  - 2/5th Field Company, Royal Australian Engineers
  - 2/6th Field Company, Royal Australian Engineers
  - 2/4th Field Ambulance, Australian Army Medical Corps
  - 2/6th Field Ambulance, Australian Army Medical Corps
  - 14th Field Ambulance, Australian Army Medical Corps
  - Australian New Guinea Administrative Unit (ANGAU)

== Japanese forces ==
- 17th Army Headquarters (Rabaul) – Lieutenant General Harukichi Hyakutake
  - South Seas Force – Major General Tomitarō Horii
    - 55th Infantry Group Headquarters
      - 144th Infantry Regiment
        - 1/144th Battalion
        - 2/144th Battalion
        - 3/144th Battalion
      - 41st Infantry Regiment
        - 1/41st Battalion
        - 2/41st Battalion
        - 3/41st Battalion
      - 3rd Company, 55th Cavalry Regiment (less one platoon), plus Pom-Pom Gun Squad
      - 1st Company, 55th Engineer Regiment, plus Materials Platoon (part strength)
      - 2nd Company, 55th Supply Regiment
      - Disease Prevention and Water Supply Unit, 55th Division (part strength)
      - Medical Unit, 55th Division (part strength)
      - 1st Field Hospital, 55th Division
      - 1st Battalion, 5th Mountain Artillery Regiment
      - 15th Independent Engineer Regiment
