= 2/2nd Anti-Tank Regiment (Australia) =

Australian Army anti tank regiment during the Second World War

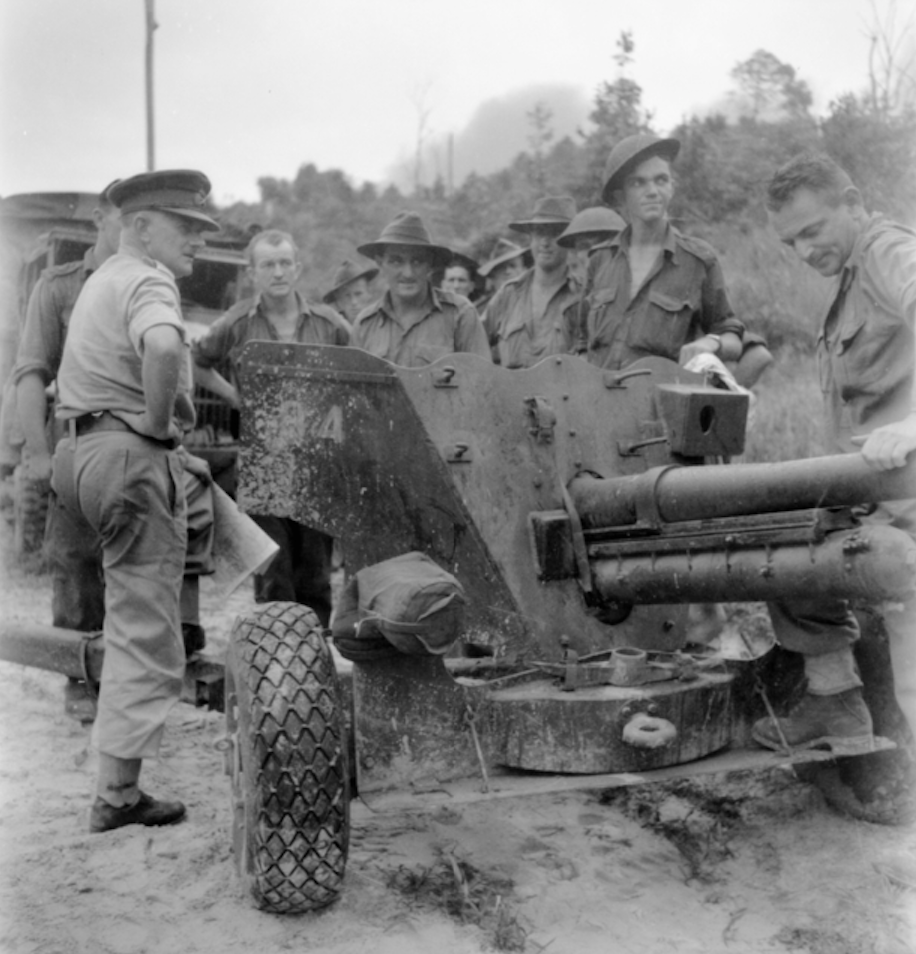
- Balikpapan, Borneo, 4 July 1945
- Active: 1940–1946
- Country: Australia
- Branch: Australian Army
- Type: Royal Australian Artillery
- Role: Tank attack
- Part of: 7th Division; Second Australian Imperial Force
- Mottos: Latin: Ubique consensu stabiles Australia ("Everywhere unanimously steady Australia")
- Engagements: World War II; Syria-Lebanon campaign; North African campaign; New Guinea campaign; Borneo campaign; Battle of Brisbane

Insignia
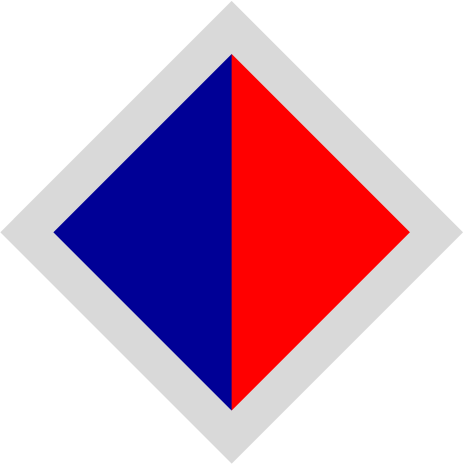
- Unit colour patch

The 2/2nd Anti-Tank Regiment was an Australian Army anti-tank artillery regiment that was raised for service during the Second World War. Formed in 1940 in Brisbane, Queensland, the regiment was assigned to the 7th Division and was deployed to North Africa in 1940, and subsequently undertook defensive duties in Egypt in 1941, before taking part in the Syria–Lebanon campaign. Garrison duties were undertaken in Syria, before the regiment was back to Australia in early 1942. It later fought against the Japanese in New Guinea and on Borneo before being disbanded in 1946.

== History ==
=== Formation ===
The 2/2nd Anti-Tank Regiment was formed near Redbank, Brisbane in Queensland in May 1940, as part of the all volunteer Second Australian Imperial Force. It consisted of four batteries: 5th, 6th, 7th, 8th Anti-Tank Batteries. The regiment would see service in the North African campaign, Northern Palestine, Egypt, Syria and then later Darwin and Borneo. The men of the 2/2nd came from all walks of life, from both the city and the country and their ages ranged from 18–40 years. The regiment became a part of the artillery force of the 7th Infantry Division, leaving Australia for the Middle East in October 1940.

=== Middle East ===
On arrival in November 1940, the regiment moved to Qastina, in Palestine, remaining there until March 1941 when they were sent to Egypt. The unit was only partially equipped and it was planned to deploy it from Deir Suneid to Amiriya to complete this process, after which it would join the 6th Infantry Division. This process was halted by the strategic situation in Libya and Egypt, which resulted in the battery being deployed to Ikingi Maryut in April. After receiving the remaining equipment, the regiment was assigned to the 7th Infantry Division and garrisoned Mersa Matruh. 'C' Troop of the regiment served at Salum in April 1941, while the 5th Battery came under command of the 7th Support Group in Salum from 12–13 April 1941. It served in the Halfaya battles during May 1941. The 6th Battery was detached to 22nd Guards Brigade and the 5th Battery to the 7th Support Group during Operation Brevity in May 1941.

In mid-May 1941, the regiment returned with the 7th Division to North Palestine and served with them in the Syrian campaign from 8 June to 12 July 1941 with the 5th Battery detached to the British 6th Infantry Division. During the fighting in Syria, the 6th Battery supported the 21st Brigade during actions at Litani, Sidon and Damour, while the 7th Battery supported the 25th Brigade at Merdjayoun and Jezzine. During the fighting at Merdjayoun, the 8th Battery, under Major Arthur Rickard helped repel a French counter-attack, destroying eight tanks. The 2/2nd remained in Syria as an occupational force until January 1942, based around Tripoli.

=== Pacific campaign ===
After being relieved by the 2/3rd Anti-Tank Regiment, the 2/2nd returned to Palestine before embarking for Australia in February 1942 as part of the convoys established to bring the AIF troops back from the Middle East following Japan's entry into the war. The regiment reached Adelaide, South Australia, in March 1942, and disembarked there. Throughout 1942, the regiment undertook defensive duties in Australia, moving northeast to Tenterfield, New South Wales, and then to south-east Queensland, with the regiment occupying positions around Woodford, Queensland. At this time, the regiment's individual batteries were assigned to brigades within the 7th Infantry Division, and as those brigades deployed to New Guinea, the batteries deployed with them. The 8th Battery deployed with the 25th Brigade in September. The following month, a three battery structure was implemented, which resulted in the 7th Battery being disbanded.

On 26 November 1942, Brisbane was shaken by riots, protesting and violence over disputes between American and Australian servicemen, in what became dubbed the Battle of Brisbane. The 2/2nd's involvement came about through the actions and death of one of its members, Gunner Edward Webster, who was the only person killed during the riots. Private Norbert Grant, a United States military policeman fatally shot Webster with a shotgun which was fired three times, wounding many other Australian servicemen at the same time during a frantic struggle to disarm Grant. Grant was court-martialled by the US military for manslaughter, but he was later acquitted as his actions were deemed have been self defence.

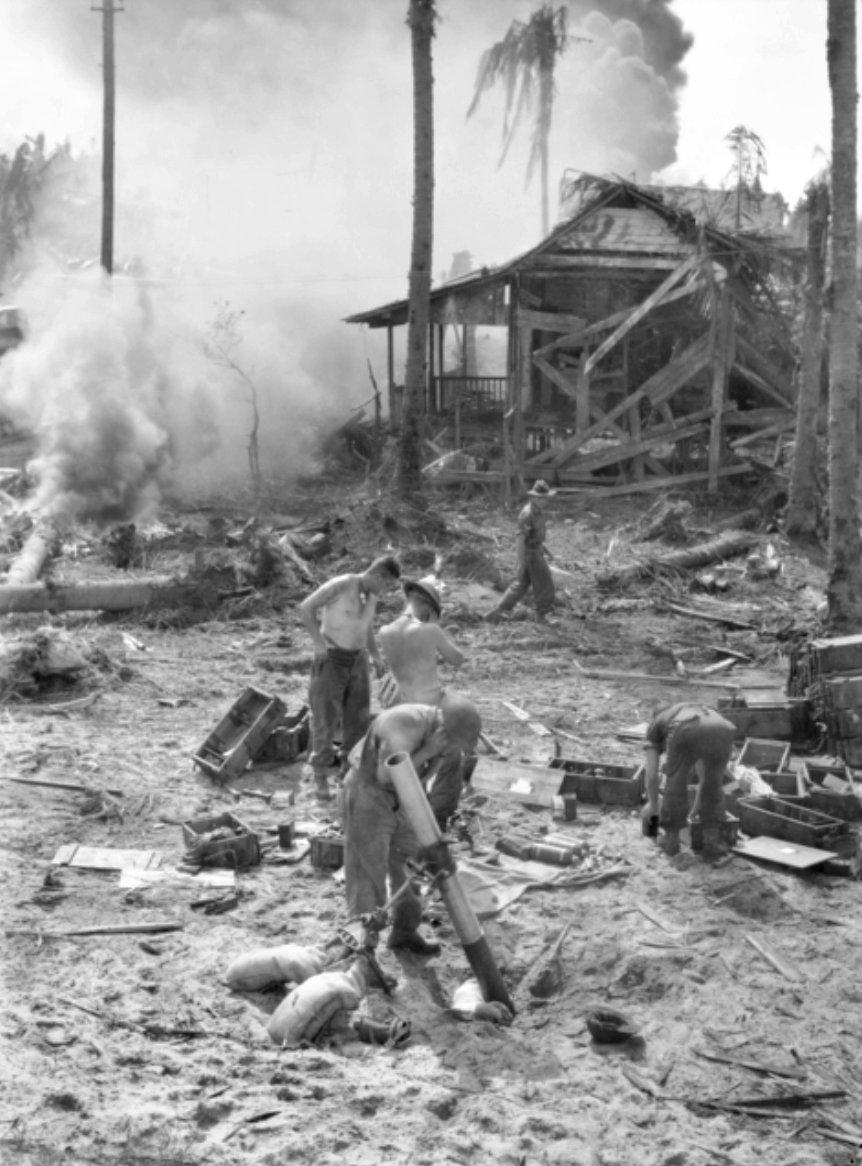
2/2nd Anti-Tank Regiment shelling Japanese positions in Balikpapan, Borneo with a 4.2 inch mortar.

That same month, the regiment was deployed to Port Moresby, as part of a plan to use them to defend Buna as part of Lilliput Force; due to delays in shipping, they arrived in December, landing at Oro Bay. Here, the regiment concentrated the 5th and 6th Batteries, and assumed command of several smaller detachments including US units. The regiment was renamed the 2/2nd Tank Attack Regiment in March 1943 and the following month it moved to Milne Bay, to occupy beach defences. While there, they came under the command of the 5th Infantry Division. This assignment changed to Headquarters Milne Bay Fortress in June.

The regiment returned to Australia in October 1943, and was concentrated under the First Australian Army at Helidon, Queensland, and received reinforcements from several Militia tank attack regiments that were disbanded at this time. In June 1944, the regiment moved to Batchelor, in the Northern Territory, to replace 103rd Anti-Tank Regiment under Northern Territory Force. The 2/2nd then left in September 1944 for Atherton, Queensland, there it trained with the 7th Division. The unit then deployed to Morotai Island in June 1945, preparation for commitment to Borneo. It landed with 7th Division at Balikpapan on 1 July 1945, where it saw out the rest of the war, being utilised as ad hoc infantry and in the field artillery role.

Two members of the regiment, Staff Sergeant D. L. W. Morrison and Major G. G. Schneider, are recorded by the Australian War Memorial to have been captured in the Malayan Campaign and then made prisoners of war. Twenty men are recorded to have been killed in service of the 2/2nd; of these, two were killed on Australian soil.

=== Disbandment ===
The 2/2nd was disbanded in Queensland in 1946 along with the rest of the 7th Division. After the war, its members held annual meetings in Brisbane, Queensland, until 2004, when its remaining numbers were too low to support such a practise. Military decorations awarded to members of the 2/2nd Anti-Tank included two Distinguished Service Orders, two Military Crosses, two Military Medals and five mentions in despatches. A total of 19 men of the 2/2nd feature on the Roll of Honour at the Australian War Memorial. Battle honours mentioned on the 2/2nd's ANZAC Day banner are: Syria, Palestine, Egypt, New Guinea, Morotai, Balikpapan and Libya.

== Gallery ==
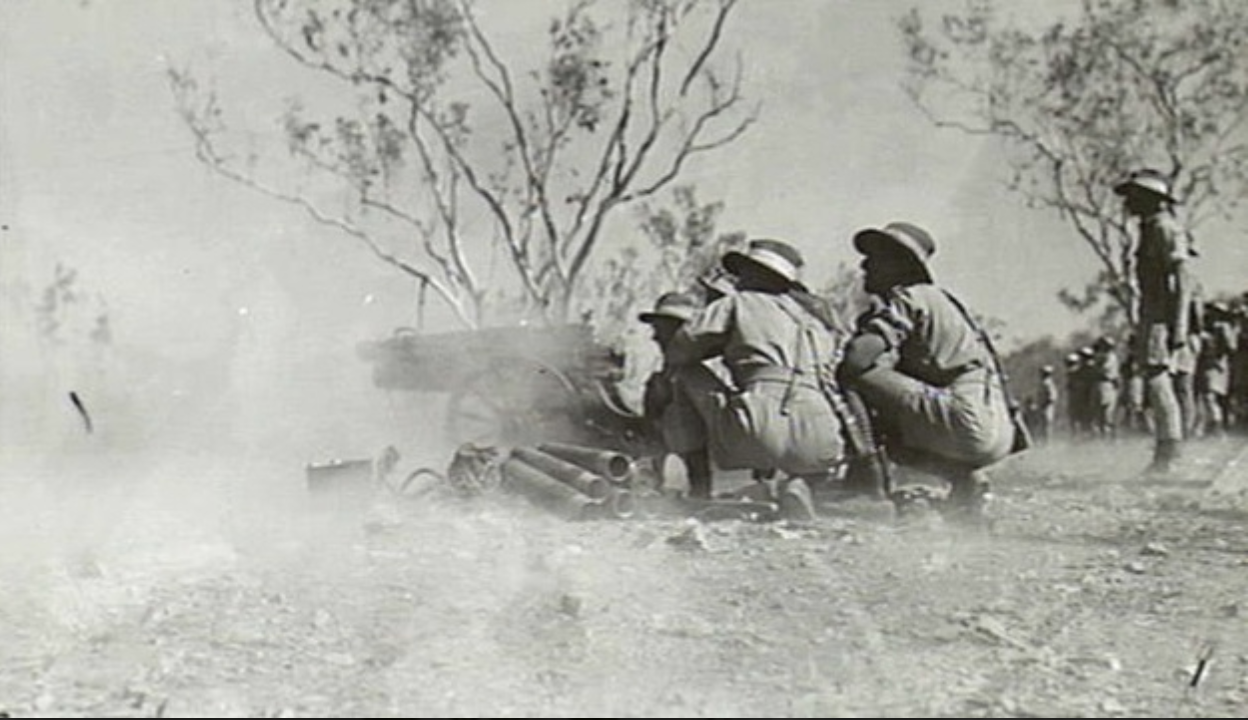
75mm Pack Howitzer demonstration by the 2/2nd.

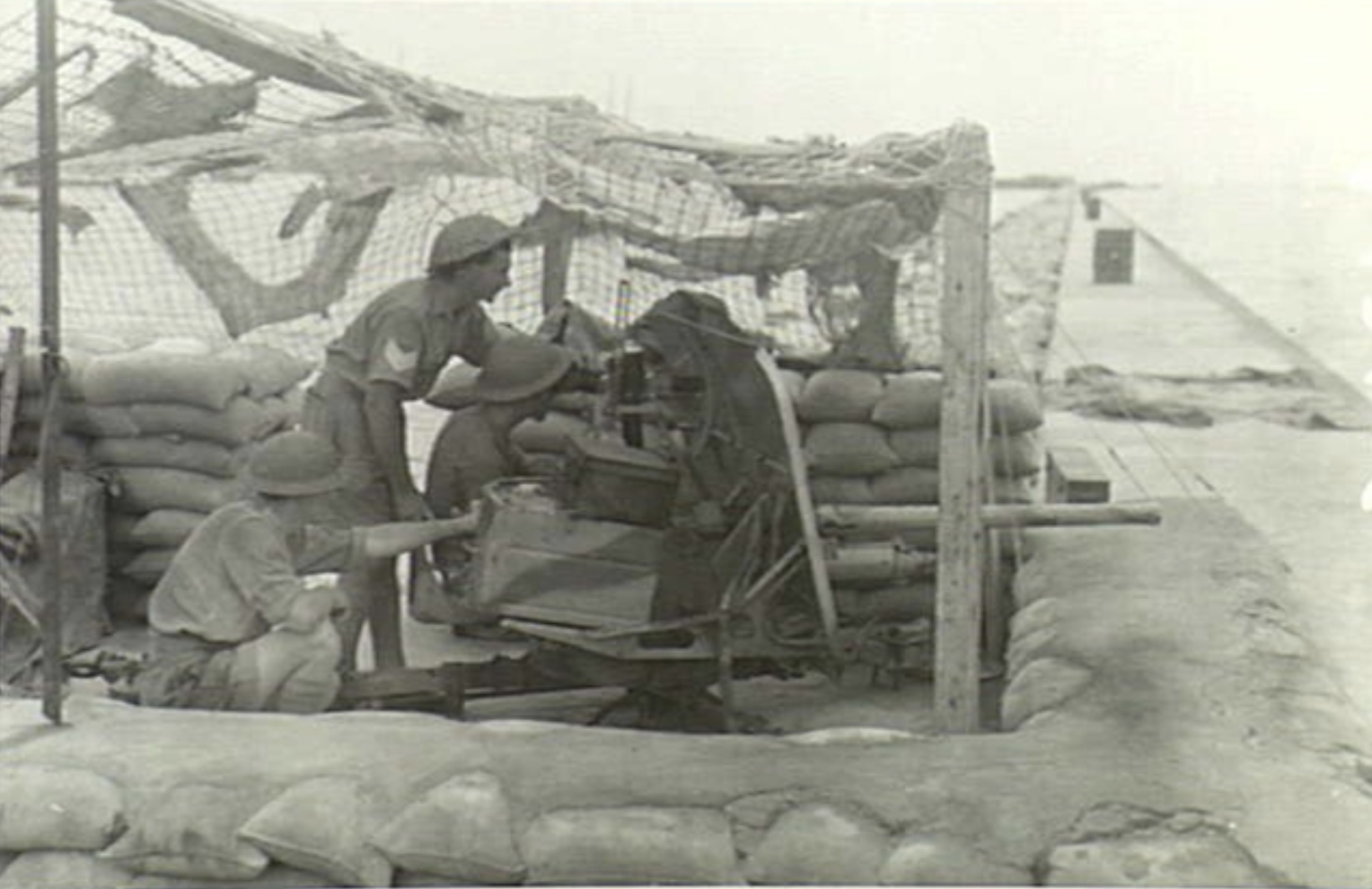
Elements of the 2/2nd on occupational duties in Tripoli 1941.

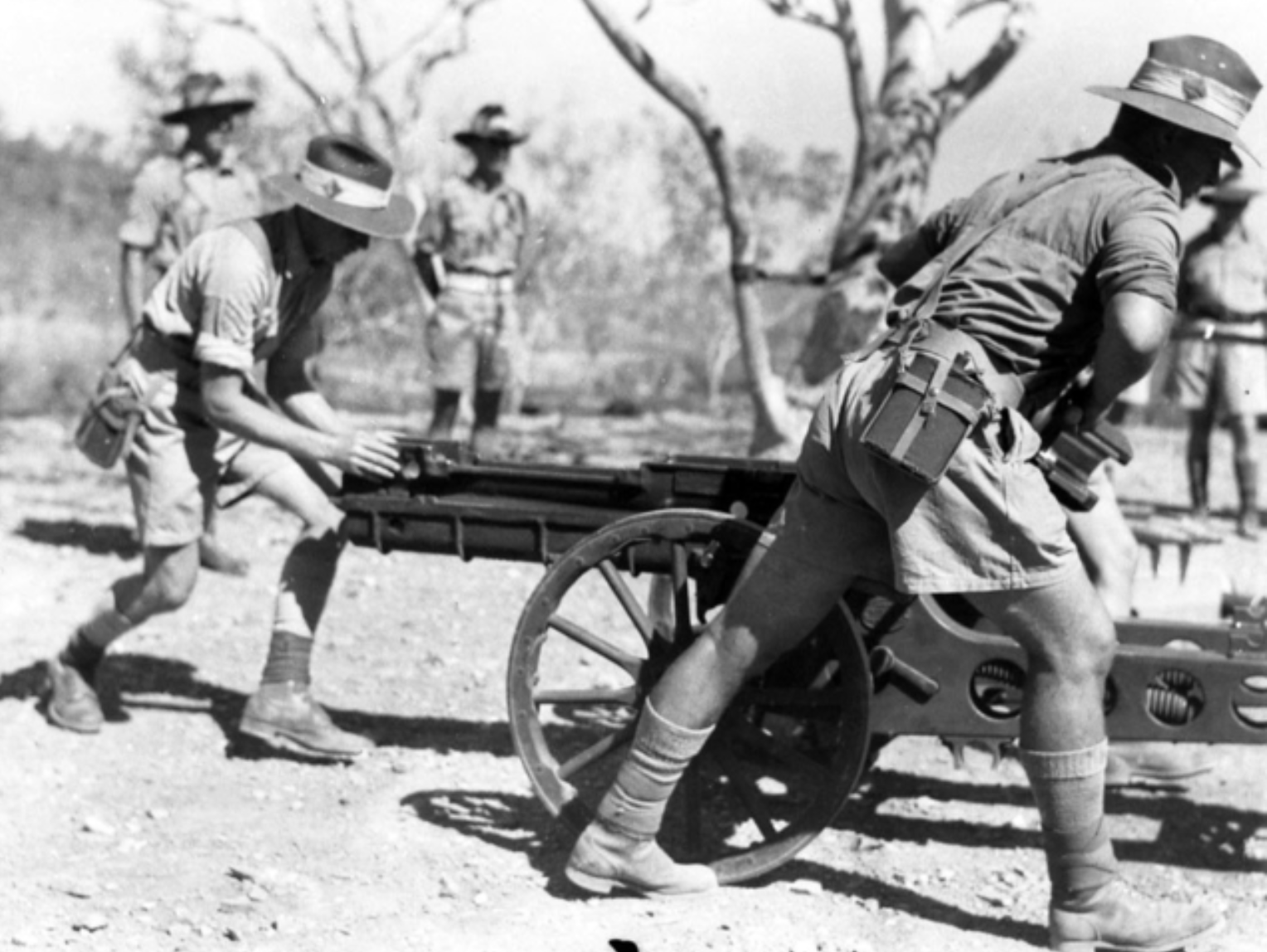
Members of the 2/2nd Tank Attack Regiment removing the breech block during a demonstration of stripping a 75mm Pack Howitzer.

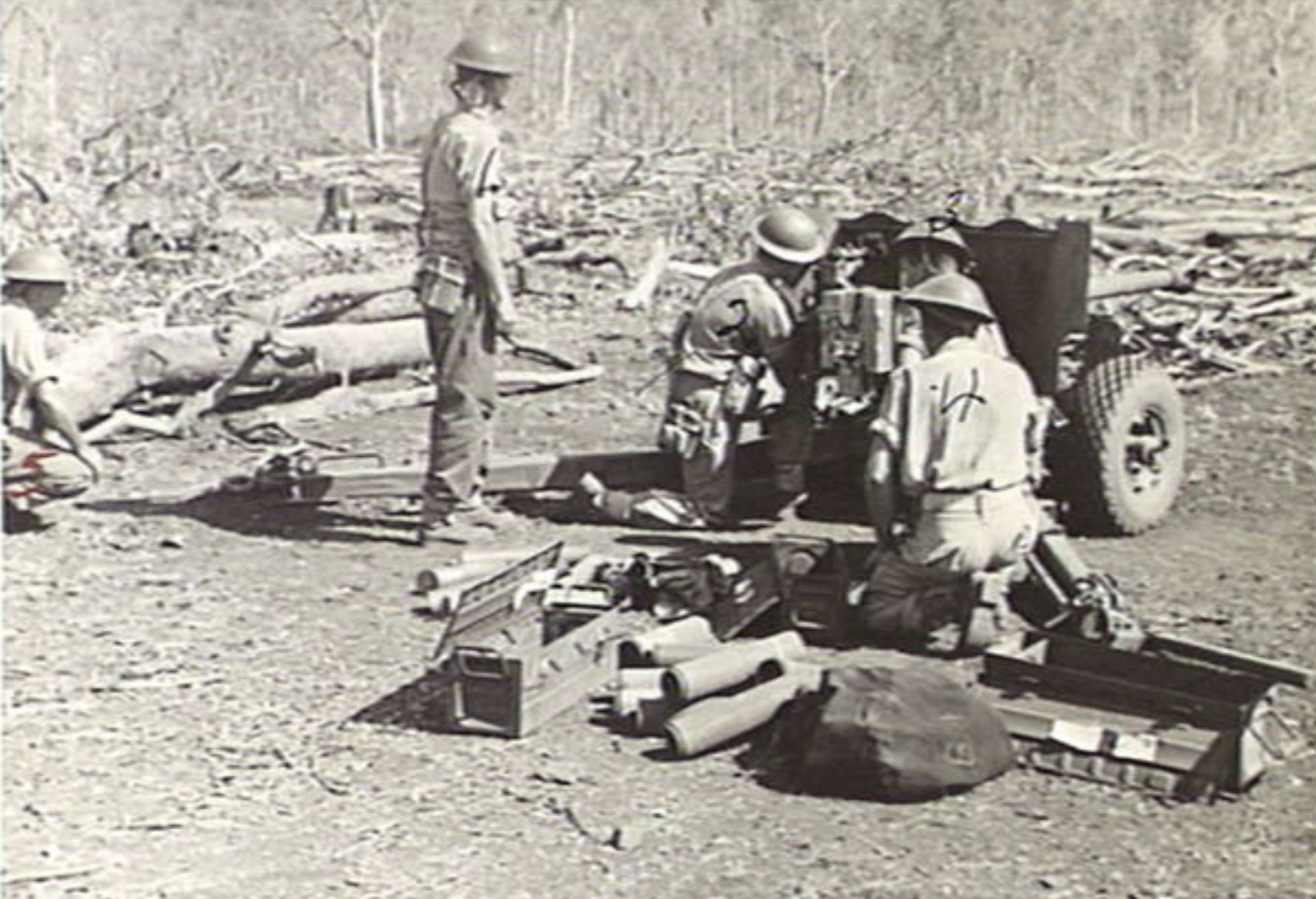
Tank Rock, Queensland, 27 November 1944. A 2/2nd Tank Attack Regiment gun crew load 6-pounder gun during practice at the artillery range.
