= Chaforce =

Australian infantry force in World War II

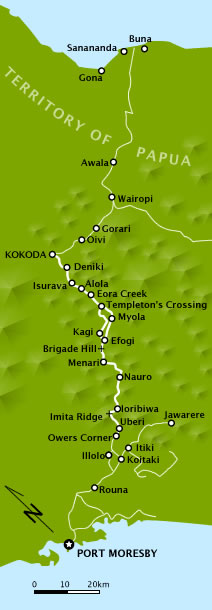
The Kokoda Track

Chaforce was an ad hoc Australian infantry force formed during the Kokoda Track Campaign of the Pacific War, World War II. It was nominally of battalion size but consisting of only three rifle companies and a headquarters element, it was therefore proportionally smaller, with an initial strength of 407 all ranks.

After withdrawal of the 21st Brigade from fighting along the Kokoda Track, Brigadier Arnold Potts proposed that a special force be raised to conduct a long range penetration and harassment of the Japanese line of communication between Wairopi and Buna–Gona. The force was raised with each battalion of the 21st Brigade (2/14th Infantry Battalion, 2/16th Infantry Battalion and 2/27th Infantry Battalion) contributing a rifle company drawn from the fittest of those recently withdrawn from the fighting, having been relieved by the 25th Brigade as the Australian forces withdrew to Imita Ridge following the Battle of Ioribaiwa. The force was commanded by Lieutenant Colonel Hugh Challen and named for this officer. Challen had been brigade major of the 21st Brigade and had been appointed to command the 2/14th Battalion after Lieutenant Colonel Arthur Key had been killed in action. The plan called for the force to move forward to Myola, where it would cross into the head-waters of the Kumusi River, whence it would traverse the valley toward Wairopi.

The plan was approved by New Guinea Force on 7 October 1942 but approval was subsequently rescinded due to a lack of aerial reconnaissance and concerns about the fitness of the force, even though the force had arrived at Myola on 18 October and an advance patrol from there had already deployed. Major General Arthur Allen proposed employing the force to conduct a less ambitious close flanking mission but this too was vetoed on 24 October. When the proposed independent mission had been definitely cancelled, Challen was recalled to command the 2/14th Battalion.

The Chaforce companies were mainly employed as work parties in support of the 16th Brigade as it advanced on Kokoda. Author, Raymond Paull, notes significant disaffection in the ranks as a result that they were considered fit for these duties but not for the fighting for which they had volunteered. Major General George Vasey, had replaced Allen in command of the 7th Division. He decided that Chaforce should reinforce the depleted battalions of the 25th Brigade for the advance on Gona. Each of the force's rifle companies was attached to a battalion of the brigade. The force was to never engage the Japanese as a unit. The 21st Brigade reinforced the 25th Brigade in front of Gona. The Chaforce companies rejoined their parent units when the 25th Brigade was withdrawn from the fighting.
