= 2/3rd Battalion (Australia) =

Former infantry battalion of the Australian Army

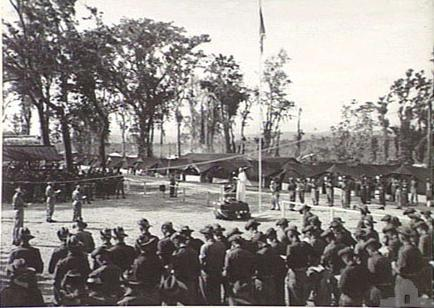
- Members of the 2/3rd Battalion during a memorial service held for members of the unit who were killed in the Aitape–Wewak campaign
- Active: 24 October 1939 – 8 February 1946
- Country: Australia
- Branch: Australian Army
- Type: Infantry
- Size: ~800–900 men (Note: The establishment of a standard Australian infantry battalion was 35 officers and 875 other ranks at the start of the Second World War. Under the jungle organisation each battalion was reduced by one officer and 106 other ranks.)
- Part of: 16th Brigade, 6th Division
- Colours: Brown over green
- Engagements: Second World War: North African campaign; Greece; Crete; Syrian campaign; Kokoda Track campaign; Aitape–Wewak campaign

Insignia
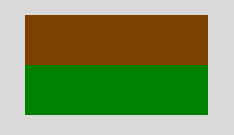
- Unit colour patch

The 2/3rd Battalion was an infantry battalion of the Australian Army. Raised for service during the Second World War as part of the Second Australian Imperial Force (2nd AIF), it was formed in October 1939 in Sydney and was attached to the 16th Brigade, 6th Division, the first formation raised as part of the 2nd AIF during the war. Deploying to the Middle East in early 1940, it saw action in North Africa, Greece, Crete, and Syria in 1941–1942 before returning to Australia following Japan's entry into the war, and was one of only two Australian infantry battalions to fight against all the major Axis powers of the war: the Germans, Italians, Japanese and Vichy French.

In 1942–1943, the battalion took part in fighting along the Kokoda Track before returning to Australia where it spent over a year training and being rebuilt. In December 1944, the 2/3rd returned to New Guinea to take part in the Aitape–Wewak campaign and remained there until the war ended. Following the end of hostilities, the battalion was disbanded on 8 February 1946 in Brisbane. The battalion's battle honours are perpetuated by the Royal New South Wales Regiment.

== History ==
=== Formation ===
Upon the outbreak of the Second World War the Australian government decided to raise an all-volunteer force for service overseas, due to the provisions of the Defence Act (1903) which restricted the deployment of the part-time Militia to only those areas considered to be Australian territory. This force was known as the Second Australian Imperial Force (2nd AIF), and the 6th Division was the first to be raised. As a unit of this formation, the 2/3rd Battalion was formed at Victoria Barracks, Sydney, on 24 October 1939. Along with the 2/1st, 2/2nd and 2/4th Battalions, the 2/3rd (Note: The numerical designation of 2nd AIF units was prefixed by "2/", which was used to set them apart from Militia units with corresponding numerical designations.) was assigned to the 16th Brigade.

Although initially the infantry battalions of the 6th Division adopted the Australian battalion structure of two rifle companies, a support company, a light machine gun platoon and an administrative headquarters, they soon switched to the British structure with four rifle companies – each consisting of three platoons with three sections – and a headquarters company consisting of signals, carrier, pioneer, anti-aircraft, transport, administrative and mortar platoons.

The battalion's first commanding officer was Lieutenant Colonel Vivian England, an officer who had fought in the First World War and had continued to serve in the Militia after the war, commanding the 55th Battalion. Personnel for the battalion were raised from an area around New South Wales that is known by the Aboriginal name of "The Werriwa". This area is bounded by a line from Sydney to Bega in the south, and from Bega, west to the Snowy Mountains, Cooma, Canberra, Yass, then north to Sydney through the Goulburn and Liverpool areas. The men were enlisted from 20 October onwards, and by 3 November 1939 the battalion was formed. The colours chosen for the unit colour patch (UCP) were the same as those of the 3rd Battalion, a unit which had served during the First World War before being raised as a Militia formation in 1921. These colours were chocolate over green, in a horizontal rectangle, although a 3 mm border of gray was added to the UCP to distinguish the battalion from its Militia counterpart, which would also go on to serve with distinction during the war.

Following a brief period of training at Liverpool and Ingleburn, the battalion took part in a farewell march through Sydney. The Sydney Morning Herald of 4 January 1940 gave an account of their farewell march: "The long khaki columns thrilled the hearts of Sydney as it had not been so moved for a quarter of a century since that still, spring day in 1914 when the first A.I.F. marched through the same streets on its way to Anzac and imperishable glory; the marching was magnificent." Afterwards, the battalion sailed in the first troop convoy to leave Australia on 9–10 January 1940, embarking upon the transport Orcades. They disembarked at El Kantara on the Suez Canal on 14 February 1940, and from there they were trucked to their camp at Julis in Palestine, where they undertook further training.

=== First actions: North Africa, 1941 ===
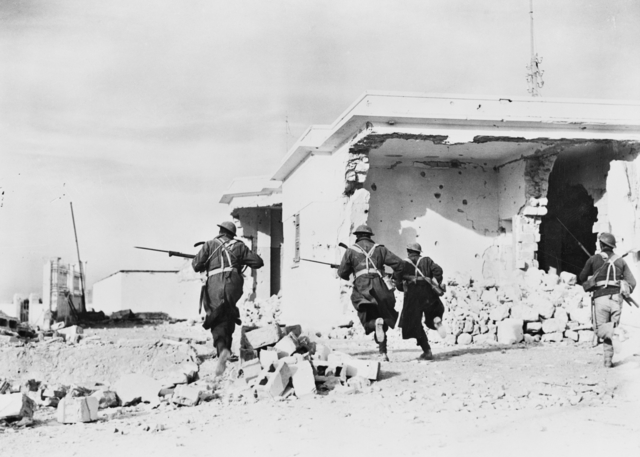
Troops from the 6th Division enter Bardia, January 1941

The first engagement that Australian troops were involved in during the Second World War came at Bardia, a major Italian military outpost in the north of Libya. The 16th Brigade broke through Bardia's western defensive perimeter at dawn on 3 January 1941, when the 2/1st Battalion breached the wire defences and swung left before advancing. The 2/2nd Battalion followed suit, swinging to the right, and the 2/3rd then moved straight through the breach. Late in the day, a counter-attack by Italian tanks threatened the 2/3rd Battalion's headquarters, until a hastily organised defensive action led by the commanding officer, England, and a platoon of anti-tank guns restored the situation. Meanwhile, the 17th Brigade led a diversion to the south. Although the 16th Brigade was able to capture Bardia in the late afternoon of 4 January, resistance continued, and fighting did not cease until the next morning. Over 40,000 Italians were captured along with significant amounts of equipment and material – including food and ammunition – which was in short supply. A significant amount of alcohol was also captured by the Australians in Italian dugouts inside the 2/3rd's position around Wadi-el-Ghereida. During this period, the 2/3rd lost five officers and 56 men killed or wounded.

After this, the Allied forces advanced to the fortified naval outpost of Tobruk. The 6th Division attacked the perimeter defences early on 21 January, following a week of continuous bombardment from both land and sea. The 2/3rd Battalion was tasked with breaching the outer Italian defences for the 2/1st Battalion to pass through. Following the initial breakthrough, the 2/3rd then advanced west along the inner ring of defences, attacking a number of Italian posts as they went. Tobruk fell the next day, with the Italians surrendering to Brigadier Horace Robertson, the commander of the 19th Brigade. The Italian flag was taken down and in the absence of an Australian flag, a signaler from the 2/4th Battalion tied his slouch hat to the flag staff and hauled it up to the top. The battalion's losses during the fighting for Tobruk were seven officers and 50 men killed or wounded.

Following the capture of the town, the 2/3rd garrisoned Tobruk, although B Company was detached to the 19th Brigade for its assault on Derna, and remained there after its capture on 30 January. Prime Minister Robert Menzies interrupted his journey from Australia to England to address the troops after the capture of Tobruk. On 7 March 1941, the battalion left Tobruk, along with the rest of the 6th Division, to bolster the Allied defences in Greece. On the eve of the battalion's next campaign, Lieutenant Colonel Donald Lamb assumed command from England, who had been criticised for his handling of the battalion during the fighting around Bardia.

=== Reverses in Greece and Crete, 1941 ===
On 18 March 1941, the 2/3rd Battalion sailed from Alexandria aboard HMS Gloucester, arriving in Greece and landing in the port of Piraeus on the following day, after a 22-hour voyage during which their convoy had been attacked numerous times by Axis aircraft. After the invasion of the country on 6 April, they were moved north to attempt to turn back the German forces. The following day they occupied Veria, and on 12 April the 6th Division was grouped together with the 2nd New Zealand Division and a lone British brigade to form an Anzac Corps. This formation did not last long, however, as the Greek government requested Allied forces withdraw from Greece on 16 April before ceasing organised resistance on 18 April. Due to a series of withdrawals elsewhere, the battalion was forced to pull back from its positions at Veria and did not come into contact with the Germans until 18 April when they attempted to block passage of the Tempe Gorge. Fighting alongside the 2/2nd Battalion and New Zealanders, the rearguard action was successful and enabled the Allies to withdraw to the south. Brigadier Arthur Allen, commander of the 16th Brigade, later wrote of this encounter: "it was a fantastic battle. Everyone was on top, with no time to dig in, and all in the front line, including artillery, Bren carriers and infantry, as well as headquarters, with transport only yards in the rear. Some confusion could be expected in the circumstances, with every weapon firing and aircraft almost continually strafing from above. If you saw it in the cinema you would say the author had never seen battle."

With the Germans enjoying numerical superiority on the ground, and with the Luftwaffe in total control of the skies, they then captured the township of Tempe. Although fierce rearguard fighting continued while the Australian and New Zealand forces withdrew to a new defensive line at Thermopylae, the situation deteriorated. An official evacuation plan was issued on 21 April, and on 25 April – Anzac Day – parties of evacuating Allied troops marched through Athens on their way to the coast. The 2/3rd Battalion embarked from Kalamata on 27 April. The 2/3rd's casualties during the campaign amounted to 14 killed, 31 wounded and 62 captured.

While the majority of the 2/3rd Battalion was successfully evacuated to Egypt, a small force of 141 men were evacuated to the island of Crete instead, after the transport ship they were on was sunk. Having formed the rearguard during the withdrawal from Greece, they had embarked separately from the main body, being taken aboard the Costa Rica. During the voyage to Alexandria, the transport had been attacked by German aircraft, and as it sank, they were ordered to abandon ship. After being rescued by Royal Navy destroyers, the troops were transported to Crete, where they were formed into a composite battalion with men from other units of the 16th Brigade, and together the unit became known as the 16th Brigade Composite Battalion.

With only limited small arms and ammunition they moved to positions above Kalives on the shores of Suda Bay to undertake garrison duties in anticipation of a German attack on the island. Following the German invasion on 20 May 1941, some of these troops saw direct action against German paratroopers. After the Allied evacuation from the island a week later, they undertook active patrols around the island before being evacuated on 31 May 1941 aboard HMS Phoebe. They arrived in Alexandria on 1 June 1941. Two 2/3rd Battalion men were killed during the fighting on Crete, and one was wounded. Fifty became prisoners of war. Meanwhile, the rest of the battalion had concentrated in Palestine, where it was rebuilt in advance of its next campaign.

=== Securing Syria and Lebanon, 1941–1942 ===
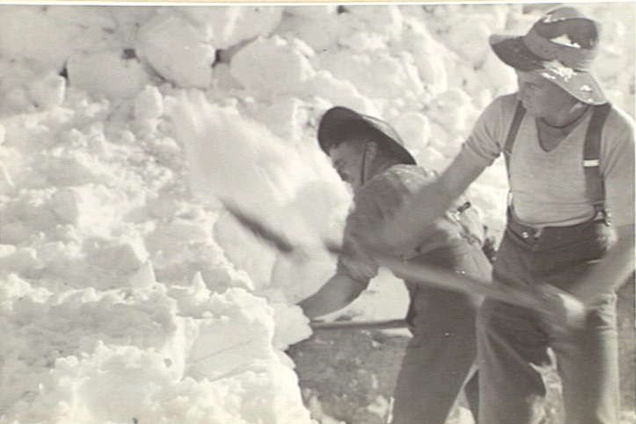
Troops from the 2/3rd clearing snow in Syria, January 1942

Australian troops from the 7th Division were already fighting in the Syria–Lebanon Campaign when the re-formed 2/3rd Battalion, along with the 2/5th Battalion and the 6th Division Cavalry Regiment, were committed as reinforcements, to help bring the 7th Division up to strength. In a bitter campaign that lasted 28 days, Vichy French forces attempted to resist the Allied invasion, which had been launched to deny the Germans the use of Vichy territory to launch attacks against Egypt. Against a modest Allied force with only limited armour and artillery, the well-equipped French force outnumbered the attackers and had the advantage of holding the mountainous terrain. Having contributed a company to garrison duties around Sidon in Lebanon, and provided 100 men to help re-form the shattered 2/1st Battalion, the 2/3rd was understrength – consisting of only 21 officers and 385 other ranks – when it entrained at Majdal in Palestine on 18 June 1941 to join the campaign.

Initially, after arriving from Palestine, the battalion was committed to forming a block on the road between Damascus and Deraa; they were later committed to an attack to sever the Beirut road around Mezze, as part of wider fighting around Damascus on 20–21 June. On the evening of 20 June, the battalion advanced to help relieve the 5th Indian Infantry Brigade which had become surrounded, and during a series of confused night-time actions, captured several forts to the west of Mezze. After a French counterattack on Fort Sarrail, most of the battalion's headquarters company was briefly captured, including the 2/3rd's commanding officer, Lamb, who was wounded in the action. An Australian counterattack early on 21 June freed the captured personnel, though, and together with a successful defensive action in the Barada Gorge, helped force the Vichy defenders in Damascus to surrender. The following week, with Major John Stevenson, the battalion's second-in-command, in charge, the 2/3rd was transferred to the British 16th Brigade. Operating with British and Indian forces on the right flank, the 2/3rd launched an unsuccessful action at Jebel Mazar on 24–28 June, where they were tasked with capturing the high ground overlooking the main road, along which the Australians were advancing.

After this, the battalion came under command of the re-formed 17th Brigade, which was reconstituted to bring the 7th Division up to full strength as it operated along the coast. Despite being well below strength – consisting of just two companies with a total of 300 men – it joined the fighting at Damour on 6–10 July, advancing along the Darmour River and leading the 17th Brigade's advance. Amidst heavy fighting the Allied forces slowly advanced simultaneously along the coast and inland, finally overcoming the Vichy French defences. Following the armistice on 14 July, the troops remained in Syria until January 1942 preparing defences and undertaking other garrison duties. The battalion's casualties during the short campaign amounted to 16 killed and 77 wounded.

=== Garrison duties in Ceylon, 1942 ===
Following Japan's entry into the war in December 1941 the decision was made to bring the 6th Division back to bolster the Allied defences in the Pacific, and the 2/3rd Battalion left the Middle East on 10 March 1942, aboard the steamer Orontes. The original intention was that they would be sent to reinforce Java; however, while they were at sea concerns about a Japanese attack on Ceylon (now Sri Lanka) prompted the diversion of the 16th and 17th Brigades to Colombo, and they arrived there on 21 March. The freighter Ben Rennies, carrying the battalion's vehicles, arrived shortly afterwards and the 2/3rd took up defensive positions in the southeast part of the island, which was considered to be the most likely location for a Japanese invasion force to land.

On 5 April, a Japanese naval force sortied from the recently captured Andaman Islands and launched a series of attacks by carrier-based aircraft on Colombo and Trincomalee. Another attack occurred on 9 April. Little damage was done on land, but both the British and Australian navies suffered losses. Regardless, the Japanese failed to sustain their initial momentum and the expected invasion did not occur. Nevertheless, men from the 2/3rd Battalion were kept busy for the remainder of their time preparing defences, manning anti-aircraft positions and undertaking jungle training, while receiving instruction in lessons learned from operations in Malaya and Singapore. The men were taught how to use the jungle according to author Paul Ham "...to 'melt' into the foliage; to retrace their steps at night; to use camouflage properly; to detect human presence by crushed twigs and disturbed leaf mould; to move silently over undergrowth. To build shelters; and to discern human from animal sounds."

In July, British forces were sent from India to relieve the Australian troops in Ceylon. Preparations were made for the 2/3rd Battalion to return to Australia, and after embarking upon the SS Westernland, they arrived in Melbourne on 8 August 1942, having returned via the southern route away from the Japanese submarines patrolling the east coast. After this, the troops all received two weeks home leave, staggered from the time of their arrival. The final group had their leave cut short after only three days, however, when they were recalled by urgent telegram. The 16th Brigade was again on the move, this time to Port Moresby in New Guinea, where the fighting against the Japanese along the Kokoda Track was reaching a critical stage. After a short voyage, the brigade arrived at Port Moresby on 21 September 1942.

=== Fighting in New Guinea, 1942–1943 ===
Following their arrival at Port Moresby, the 16th Brigade along with the 25th Brigade, prepared to relieve the forces on the Kokoda Track. With the Australians having finally halted the Japanese advance, the fresh troops would be tasked with launching a counterattack to drive the Japanese back to Buna in the north. Consequently, throughout October, November and into December, the 2/3rd Battalion took part in three major actions: Eora Creek (22–28 October), Oivi (5–12 November), and an action on the Sanananda Track (21 November – 19 December).

On 3 October, General Douglas MacArthur spoke to the 16th Brigade's commander, Brigadier John Lloyd, at Ower's Corner, at the foot of the Kokoda Track: "Lloyd, by some act of God your Brigade has been chosen for this job. The eyes of the Western world are upon you. I have every confidence in you and your men. Good luck and don't stop." The 16th Brigade arrived at Templeton's Crossing on 19 October, just three days behind the 2/25th and 2/33rd Battalions, whom they relieved. The following day the 16th Brigade continued the advance but found that the Japanese had withdrawn to Eora Creek, where they had established a strong defensive position.

Here the Japanese held the high ground in well-concealed positions that had clear fields of fire into the narrow gorge below. With no other options, the 16th Brigade was forced to assault the Japanese defences frontally, advancing straight up the gorge. Amidst torrential rain and stiff defence, progress was slow as each defensive position had to be dealt with individually. As the water level in the creek rose steadily, the troops came under heavy mortar fire and were attacked with grenades lobbed from the heights above. The supply situation grew desperate too, but by 28 October the 2/3rd Battalion had managed to work its way around the Japanese right flank in preparation for an attack. In the afternoon, the battalion launched its attack, breaking through the Japanese outposts and into the main position. The defenders were overwhelmed and many of them abandoned their weapons as they fled. That night, the remaining Japanese withdrew from the position. The 16th Brigade lost 72 killed and 154 wounded in this action.

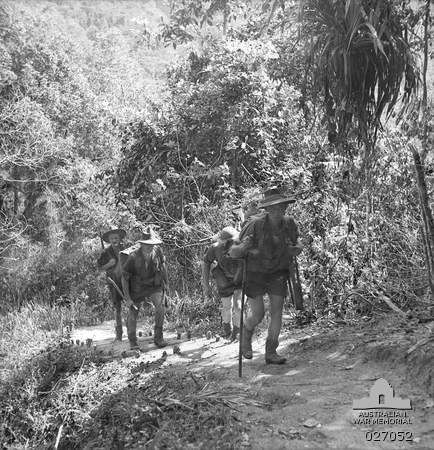
Troops from the 16th Brigade, including the 2/3rd, cross the Owen Stanleys, October 1942

Despite the successful action, the superiors of the 7th Division's commander, Major-General Arthur Allen, were dissatisfied by the counter-offensive's rate of progress, and he was relieved of his command the day before the Australian forces won through at Eora Creek. Japanese resistance decreased after that battle, and by 31 October the 16th Brigade was advancing along the eastern fork of the Track through Missima without opposition. On 2 November they passed through the recently abandoned village of Kokoda. Three days later, as the Australians advanced towards the Kumusi River, the 2/3rd Battalion went into battle at Oivi, after coming up against an entrenched force holding the high ground from Oivi to Gorari. The Japanese counter-attacked the next day, and as fighting continued through to 6 November, Major General George Vasey, the new divisional commander, sent the 25th Brigade and the 2/1st Battalion on a successful attack against the Japanese rear at Gorari. The Japanese at Oivi, their supply and withdrawal route cut, were then forced to retreat.

The 2/3rd Battalion's final involvement in the campaign came as the 16th Brigade advanced towards Sanananda in November. They left the Wairopi area on 16 November, with the battalion second in order of march. Tired and drained from the exertions of the last two months, the advance across the swamps of the coastal plain proved heavy work. On the first day they made 6 miles (9.7 km), but after heavy rains the following day and failures in the resupply effort, a large number of men fell behind due to exhaustion. On 19 November, the 2/3rd spearheaded the brigade's advance to the coast. Several Japanese stragglers were taken prisoner and a number of minor contacts followed, but the Japanese defenders withdrew before the Australians could shake out to conduct an assault.

The following morning, the brigade reached the junction of the Sananada and Cape Killerton trails, about 2 miles (3.2 km) from the coast. After the 2/1st Battalion was attacked, the 2/3rd Battalion took part in a brigade flanking attack around the Japanese position to the right, forcing the Japanese to fall back. The action, however, had severely depleted the brigade to the point where, with less than 1,000 fit men, it was unable to continue offensive operations. Thereafter activity was limited to patrolling and maintaining a defensive perimeter. In early December the 16th Brigade was relieved by the 30th Brigade. The 2/3rd Battalion itself was relieved on 6 December, returning to Poppondetta with a strength of just six officers and 67 other ranks, before being evacuated back to Port Moresby by plane on 23 December 1942. They were returned to Australia shortly afterwards for leave and to reorganise. During the fighting along the Kokoda Track and the advance north to the sea, the 2/3rd lost 69 men killed and 103 wounded.

=== Final campaign: Aitape–Wewak, 1944–1945 ===
After a short period of leave the 6th Division came together again in late January 1943 on the Atherton Tablelands to begin training, and to convert to the more austere jungle establishment. Under this structure, the size of the battalion was reduced by one officer and 106 other ranks, giving the 2/3rd Battalion a total of 803 men of all ranks. At this time, a camp was built from scratch at Wondecla, but it was 12 months before the battalion's ranks were brought to full strength by the return of sick and wounded soldiers. As the battalion began to reform, some who had performed well in the preceding campaigns were recommended for commissioning and were sent to an Officer Training Unit at Woodside, in South Australia. Along with training there was time for recreation including swimming carnivals, boxing tournaments and a 6th Division rugby league championship in which the 2/3rd Battalion was victorious, beating the 2/3rd Machine Gun Battalion in the final. The team captain, Col Windon, later went on to play for and captain the Wallabies.

During this time the battalion received a number of reinforcements from its associated Militia unit, the 3rd Battalion (The Werriwa Regiment). This unit had been fighting in New Guinea as part of the 30th Brigade, with whom it had served on the Kokoda Track alongside the 2/3rd as well as the 39th and 49th Battalions, before being returned to Australia, where it had been disbanded. Other reinforcements also arrived from the 16th Battalion, and a new commanding officer, Lieutenant Colonel Ian Hutchison took over in April 1943, having temporarily commanded the battalion during the fighting around Eora Creek in the previous campaign.

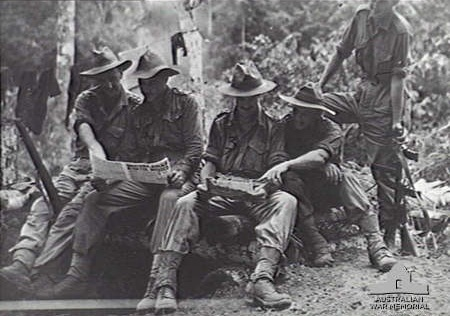
Officers from 'D' Company in New Guinea, 7 April 1945

Due to a combination of political and strategic decisions, it was almost two years before the battalion went into combat again. In late 1944, to free up American troops for operations in the Philippines, Australian forces were directed to take over responsibility for operations around Aitape in New Guinea. The 6th Division returned to New Guinea in November 1944, with the final brigade arriving on 31 December 1944. Although basically cut off from resupply, there were around 35,000 Japanese troops in the area, holding the coast past Wewak and into the interior. Supported by food supplies from native gardens in the Torricelli Mountains, the Japanese put up heavy resistance to the Australians' primary tactic of aggressive patrolling.

Tasked with reducing the Japanese, while remaining available to support operations elsewhere, the 6th Division began a limited offensive in the Wewak area. The 16th Brigade was initially held in divisional reserve, occupying a defensive position west of the Raihu River, until in February 1945 it was tasked with securing a forward supply base near Dogreto Bay and clearing up to the Anumb River, about 8 miles (13 km) to the east of the river. They came up against only minor opposition and by 23 February they had crossed the Anumb; less than a month later they had progressed 6 miles (9.7 km) east, occupying the coastal town of But and removing the Japanese from the Dagua area.

During this time, contact with the Japanese was limited to small-scale actions rather than a large general action; nevertheless, these actions caused heavy casualties as the Japanese defended stubbornly. Casualties among the Australians were, according to author Eustace Keogh, "heavy in relation to the size of...the numerous small actions the Japanese forced them to fight". In addition, the strenuous nature of the campaign reduced the troops' resistance and ability to undertake proper medical precautions and as a result there were large numbers of sickness casualties. Malaria took a particularly heavy toll, with troops being affected by a particularly strong strain that proved resistant to the normal doses of atebrine. Accidents also resulted in losses. In one incident, seven men from the 2/3rd drowned when the Danmap River flooded amidst a torrential downpour.

Wewak was captured on 10 May 1945, and the 16th Brigade began pursuing the Japanese defenders that had withdrawn inland. They continued until 11 August, when offensive operations ceased after word was received that the Japanese had entered into ceasefire talks. The battalion was in the Mount Shiburangu area on 15 August when news came that the Japanese had surrendered following the atomic bombing of Hiroshima and Nagasaki. The battalion's losses during its final campaign were 51 killed and 76 wounded.

=== Disbandment ===
After the cessation of hostilities, the battalion remained in the Aitape–Wewak area undertaking occupation duties. Its strength was slowly reduced as personnel were repatriated to Australia for demobilisation or transferred to other units for further service. Eventually, the remaining cadre of personnel returned to Australia, and on 8 February 1946 the 2/3rd Battalion disbanded in Brisbane, as one of the most decorated battalions of the 2nd AIF. They had fought all the major Axis powers: the Italians, Germans, Vichy French and Japanese. Alongside the Australian 2/5th Battalion, they were the only Allied troops able to make this claim. During its service a total of 3,303 men served with the 2/3rd Battalion of whom 203 were killed and 432 wounded. Members of the 2/3rd received four Distinguished Service Orders, 16 Military Crosses, 12 Distinguished Conduct Medals, 30 Military Medals, two British Empire Medals and 73 Mentions in Despatches.

In 1948, the Militia units that had fought during the war were re-raised as part of the Citizens Military Force (CMF), and it was decided to entrust the battle honours of the 2nd AIF units to their associated CMF units. As a result, the 2/3rd Battalion's battle honours were passed to the 3rd Battalion (The Werriwa Regiment), which was reformed around Canberra. In 1960, with the introduction of the Pentropic division into the Australian Army, the CMF was reorganised and the 3rd Battalion (The Werriwa Regiment) was reduced to company strength, forming 'C' Company, 3rd Battalion, Royal New South Wales Regiment (3 RNSWR). In 1965, following the abandonment of the Pentropic divisional structure, the 3rd Battalion was reformed in its own right as the individual companies were split up to form new battalions with the old regionally based numerical designations. In 1987, however, following another reorganisation of the Army Reserve which saw a reduction in the number of the infantry battalions across Australia, 3 RNSWR was linked with 4 RNSWR to become 4th/3rd Battalion, Royal New South Wales Regiment (4/3 RNSWR).

== Battle honours ==
The 2/3rd Battalion received the following battle honours for its service during the war:

- North Africa, Bardia 1941, Capture of Tobruk, Syria 1941, Damascus 1941, Dimas, Damour, Greece 1941, Mount Olympus, Tempe Gorge, South-West Pacific 1942–1945, Kokoda Trail, Eora Creek–Templeton's Crossing II, Oivi–Gorari, Buna–Gona and Sanananda Road.

These battle honours are now carried by the Royal New South Wales Regiment.

== Commanding officers ==
The following officers commanded the 2/3rd Battalion:

- Lieutenant Colonel Vivian England (1939–1941);
- Lieutenant Colonel Donald Lamb (1941);
- Lieutenant Colonel John Stevenson (1941–1943); and
- Lieutenant Colonel Ian Hutchison (1943–1946).

== Notes ==
Footnotes

Citations
