= Jim Gordon (Australian soldier) =

Recipient of the Victoria Cross

James Gordon VC
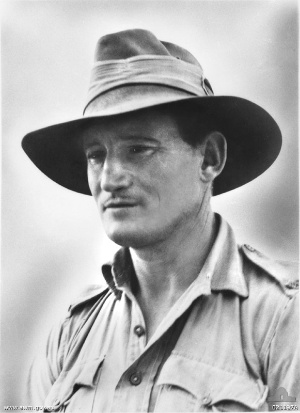
- Corporal James Gordon in October 1941
- Born: 7 March 1909; Rockingham, Western Australia
- Died: 24 July 1986 (aged 77); Repatriation General Hospital, Hollywood, Western Australia
- Relatives: William Gordon (father); Sir John Gordon (uncle)
- Military career
- Allegiance: Australia
- Branch: Australian Army
- Service years: 1940–1968
- Rank: Warrant Officer Class II
- Units: 2/31st Battalion
- Conflicts: Second World War; Syria-Lebanon campaign; Battle of the Litani River; Battle of Jezzine; Battle of Merdjayoun; Battle of Damour; New Guinea campaign; Battle of Buna–Gona; Salamaua–Lae campaign; Finisterre Range campaign
- Awards: Victoria Cross

James Hannah Gordon, VC (7 March 1909 – 24 July 1986) was an Australian recipient of the Victoria Cross, the highest award for gallantry in the face of the enemy that can be awarded to British and Commonwealth forces. Gordon was one of 20 Australians to receive the award for their actions during the Second World War, receiving it for deeds he performed while fighting against the Vichy France during the Syria-Lebanon campaign, in which he personally bayonetted five Vichy French machine-gunners in the Battle of Jezzine.

Gordon later served against the Japanese in the New Guinea campaign and after the war became a soldier in the Australian Regular Army, serving until 1968. He died in 1986, at the age of 77.

== Early life ==
Gordon was born in Rockingham, Western Australia, one of eight children born to William Beattie Gordon, a farmer who served as a state parliamentarian between 1901 and 1911, and his wife Harriet Ann Scott. Growing up on farming properties near Moora and in Gingin, Western Australia, after completing his schooling, Gordon undertook various laboring jobs including droving, farming and working on the goldfields.

== Military career ==
On 26 April 1940, during the early stages of the Second World War, Gordon volunteered for overseas service, lying about his age to join the Australian Imperial Force; falsely giving his middle name as Heather. Shortly afterwards, he married Myrtle Troy at St Edmund's Church of England, Wembley Park, Perth, on 14 June 1940.

After a period of training, Gordon was sent to the Middle East in September 1940. He was later assigned to the 2/31st Battalion, an infantry unit formed in Queensland and Victoria, which was part of the 7th Australian Division, in February 1941. In June–July 1941, the unit was engaged in the Syria-Lebanon campaign against the Vichy French. During the Battle of Jezzine, on 10 July 1941, Gordon's company was "...held up by intense machine-gun and grenade fire from Vichy French forces, but on his own initiative, he crept forward alone and succeeded in getting close to the machine-gun post. He then charged it and killed the four machine-gunners with his bayonet. His action demoralised the enemy in this sector and the company advanced and took the position." Gordon was subsequently awarded the Victoria Cross for this action.

On 12 July 1942, a plaque in his honour was unveiled in front of the Gingin Post Office; it was later moved to the town's war memorial. Later that year a portrait of Jim Gordon painted in 1941 by artist William Dargie won the 1942 Archibald Prize, Australia's most famous portrait prize.

Gordon returned to Australia in March 1942, now holding the rank of corporal. While the 2/31st Battalion was soon deployed to Papua, a bout of malaria prevented Gordon from joining it until November 1942. He was promoted to sergeant in July 1943. After seeing further action during the capture of Lae and the subsequent advance through the Markham and Ramu Valleys in New Guinea, he returned to Australia in January 1944. He was hospitalised due to malaria again, and was later reassigned to administrative duties. He remained in the Army until 17 February 1947.

After discharge, Gordon briefly worked for the State Electricity Commission, before rejoining the army as a regular soldier on 2 December 1947, achieving the rank of Warrant Officer Class II in 1950. He continued service until 1 August 1968 when he retired; after this, he was employed at Campbell Barracks (Western Australia), Swanbourne, as a groundsman until 1975.

== Later life ==
Gordon died on 19 July 1986 at the Repatriation General Hospital, Hollywood. After being cremated, he received full military honours. The Jim Gordon Ward at the former Repatriation General Hospital has been named in his honour. His wife, Myrtle, and one son survived him.
