= Battle of Sidon (1941) =

- Part of the Syria–Lebanon campaign of World War II
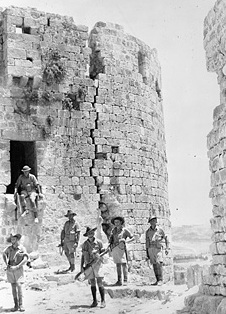
- Australian troops among the ruins of the old Crusader castle at Sidon, Lebanon, July 1941
Date	13–15 June 1941
Location	Sidon, French Lebanon 33°33′38″N 35°23′53″E
Result	Australian victory

Belligerents
Australia	Vichy France

Commanders and leaders
Jack Stevens	Henri Dentz

The Battle of Sidon (13–15 June 1941) was part of the Australian 7th Division's advance on Beirut, which took place during the five-week-long Syria-Lebanon campaign fought between the Allies and Vichy French forces in Syria and Lebanon.

Sidon, a town of about 12,000 people at the time with a number of historic mosques and castles dating back to the Crusades, was positioned on the coast to the north of Tyre, about halfway between the Lebanese border with Palestine and Beirut. The fighting came several days after the Allied forces from the Australian 21st Brigade, under Brigadier Jack Stevens, crossed the Litani River as part of Operation Exporter. After preliminary moves by the 2/27th Infantry Battalion around Adloun, the 2/14th Infantry Battalion had carried the advance north along the coast towards Sidon. On 13 June, the 2/16th Infantry Battalion, with artillery and cavalry support, was assigned the task of capturing the town itself, undertaking a daylight advance over 6.5 kilometres (4.0 mi) of open ground to reach the town, before exploiting a further 4.5 kilometres (2.8 mi) to the north. The presence of the historic buildings meant that the Australian artillery bombardment of the town was limited in an effort to prevent collateral damage, which slowed the Allied advance.

On the periphery, the 2/27th was also active around Miyeoumiye to the south-east during the fighting. The town fell on 15 June, after the Australians completed a long approach march and overcame a determined French counterattack the included tanks. French aircraft were also active during the battle, attacking the 2/4th Field Regiment's positions and the headquarters of the 2/16th Infantry Battalion.

The day after Sidon fell, further actions were fought to the east between Algerian Tirailleurs and the Australians around the high ground at Meidelyoum and Jabal Aababy, as the Australians cut the road between Sidon and Jezzine, which had been captured on 13 June by troops from the Australian 25th Brigade.

The next stage of the fighting saw the Australians advance towards Damour, which fell in early July. Following the war, a battle honour was awarded to the 2/16th and 2/27th Infantry Battalions, the 2/3rd Machine Gun Battalion, and the 6th and 9th Divisional Cavalry Regiments.
