= John Rowlstone Stevenson =

Australian army and parliamentary officer

John Stevenson
- Born: 7 October 1908; Bondi, Sydney
- Died: 4 July 1971 (aged 62); Fiji
- Military career
- Allegiance: Australia
- Branch: Citizens Military Force; Second Australian Imperial Force
- Service years: 1925–1959
- Rank: Major General
- Commands: 2nd Division (1957–59); 5th Brigade (1948–51); 11th Brigade (1943–45); 2/3rd Battalion (1941–43)
- Conflicts: Second World War; Syria–Lebanon Campaign; Battle of Damour; New Guinea campaign; Kokoda Track campaign; Bougainville Campaign
- Awards: Commander of the Order of the British Empire; Distinguished Service Order; Mentioned in Despatches (2); Commander of the Order of Orange-Nassau (Netherlands)

Major General John Rowlstone Stevenson, CBE, DSO (7 October 1908 – 4 July 1971) was an Australian Army officer and a parliamentary officer.

Stevenson was born in Bondi, Sydney, on 7 October 1908. He was the son of John James Stevenson, who was born in the United States, and Caroline Maude née Rowlstone, from Sydney. He went to Canterbury Boys' Intermediate School, then took an office job. He also played hockey and drove racing cars at the Maroubra speedway.

He rose to the rank of major general in the Australian Army, serving in both the 11th Australian Infantry Brigade and the 2/3rd Australian Infantry Battalion in the Second World War. He died on 4 July 1971, in Fiji. He is known for accepting Nauru as Australian territory.
