= Battle of Jezzine (1941) =

Battle of World War II

Coordinates: 33.32°N 35.35°E

- Part of the Syria–Lebanon campaign of World War II
Date	13–14 June 1941
Location	Jezzine, French Lebanon
Result	Australian victory

Belligerents
Australia	Vichy France: French Lebanon

Units involved
2/31st Battalion	

The Battle of Jezzine (13 June 1941) was part of the Australian 7th Division's advance on Beirut during the five-week-long Syria-Lebanon campaign by the Allies against Vichy French forces in Syria and Lebanon. Jezzine, Lebanon, is about halfway between the Lebanese border with Mandatory Palestine and Beirut.

This battle was one of several hard-fought actions during the Australian advance on Beirut from Mandatory Palestine. Australian troops from the 25th Brigade (less the 2/33rd Battalion) attacked Jezzine on 13 June 1941, following the capture of Merdjayoun, which the Allies temporarily captured on 11 June 1941, allowing the commander of the Australian 7th Division, Major General John Lavarack to switch the 25th Brigade's focus north towards Jezzine, leaving a small force to hold Merdjayoun, which was later subjected to a heavy counter-attack.

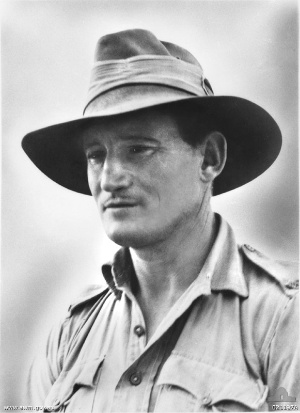
Private Jim Gordon who was awarded the Victoria Cross for his actions in the battle

During the fighting for Jezzine, when his company suffered casualties from intense machine gun fire, Private Jim Gordon, 2/31st Battalion, took it upon himself to crawl forward and neutralise the Vichy position with rifle and bayonet. Gordon, originally from Rockingham, Western Australia, was awarded the Victoria Cross for his actions near Jezzine. Jezzine Barracks in Townsville, Queensland, is named after this battle. Jezzine was later captured on the evening of 14 June.

Further west, on the coast, the Australian 21st Brigade attacked Sidon between 13 and 15 June, as part of the drive on Damour. The day after Sidon fell, the Australians cut the road between Sidon and Jezzine.
