= Battle of Merdjayoun =

Battle of World War II

Coordinates: 33.4°N 35.6°E

- Part of the Syria–Lebanon campaign of World War II
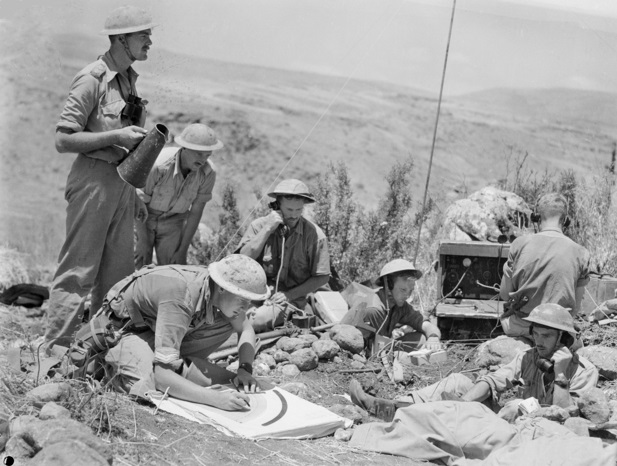
- Command post of the Australian 2/6th Field Regiment during fighting against the French in the Merdjayoun sector
Date	19–24 June 1941
Location	Marjayoun, French Lebanon
Result	Allied victory

Belligerents
United Kingdom: (British Raj) India; Australia	Vichy France: French Lebanon

Commanders and leaders
(Australia) Arthur Samuel Allen	

The Battle of Merdjayoun took place during the Syria-Lebanon Campaign of World War II from 19–24 June 1941 between Vichy French and predominantly Australian Allied forces in and near the Lebanese town of Marjayoun.

== Initial fighting ==
Australian forces advancing from the British Mandate of Palestine entered Marjayoun on 11 June 1941 against badly equipped defenders, after which the majority of the Australian 25th Brigade was diverted north to attack Jezzine, leaving a small force based around the 2/33rd Battalion to hold Merdjayoun. Following a strong Vichy French counterattack, this garrison was forced to withdraw south on 15 June. In the ensuing battle, Allied troops successfully defended the pass leading back to Palestine, and recaptured the town early on 24 June. The 7th Australian Division—commanded by Major-General Arthur "Tubby" Allen—was reinforced by units from the 6th Australian Division.

On 20 June, the French Information Office (Office Francais d'Information, OFI) of the Vichy French government announced: "Yesterday the British attempted unsuccessfully to attack Damascus and Merjayoun, Lebanon. Indian and British troops advanced in the area south and southeast of Damascus, but we succeeded in repulsing them in counterattacks by our armoured units and took 400 prisoners. Yesterday afternoon our troops warded off an enemy attack in the mountainous zone of southern Lebanon. We took 80 prisoners in this operation. Along the coast, the British fleet continued to bombard our positions."

The 2/3rd Battalion of the 6th Division was part of the column sent to relieve elements of the 5th Indian Infantry Brigade Group which had been cut off and surrounded in Mezze, a western neighborhood of Damascus, after the Battle of Damascus. They gallantly stormed the high ground near Mezze but in spite of their efforts the column were only able to fight their way into Mezze a few hours after the Allied defenders, out of ammunition and without food for the previous 50 hours, had been overrun.

The 2/5th Australian Field Regiment was also part of the relief column. Lieutenant Arthur Roden (later Sir Roden) Cutler repeatedly engaged enemy tanks, enemy infantry, enemy anti-tank, and enemy machine posts with his 25-pounder field gun, his Boys anti-tank rifle, his Bren gun, or his .303 rifle. He later lost his leg during the Battle of Damour, but was awarded the Victoria Cross for his actions at both Merdjayoun and Damour. Cutler is the only Australian artilleryman to ever been awarded the VC.

== Follow-up ==
On 29 June, the Vichy French government announced in a communique: "The British Fleet has bombed our coastal positions in the Middle East. We have evacuated several of our bases in the mountains of southern Lebanon under cover of artillery fire which inflicted heavy losses on our assailants. Our aerial forces, supported by naval aircraft, repeatedly intervened in the ground fighting, especially around Palmyra (Syria). A British colonel and 40 men were captured."

On 30 June, the Headquarters of Lieutenant-General Henry Maitland Wilson (Allied commander in Lebanon and Syria) announced: "The Allied offensive against Homs (Syria) is making substantial progress. An Australian squadron flying American-model aircraft, shot down a formation of six Vichy French Glenn Martin bombers in aerial combat. The Australians came back without losses to themselves."

== Notes and references ==
Notes

References

- Coulthard-Clark, Chris (1998). Where Australians Fought: The Encyclopaedia of Australia's Battles (1st ed.). St Leonards, New South Wales: Allen & Unwin. ISBN 1-86448-611-2.
