= 2/31st Battalion (Australia) =

Former infantry battalion of the Australian Army

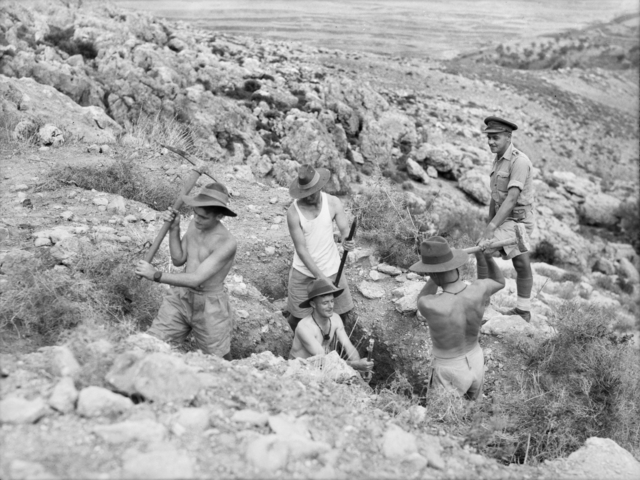
- Soldiers from the 2/31st dig a section defence post in Syria during October 1941
- Active: 1940–1946
- Country: Australia
- Branch: Australian Army
- Type: Infantry
- Size: 800–1,000 men (Note: By the start of World War II, the authorised strength of an Australian infantry battalion was 910 men all ranks, however, later in the war it fell to 803.)
- Part of: 25th Brigade, 7th Division
- Motto(s): Forever Forward
- Colours: Black over red
- Engagements: World War II: North African campaign; Syria-Lebanon campaign; New Guinea campaign; Borneo campaign

Commanders
- Notable commanders: Selwyn Porter; Murray Robson

Insignia
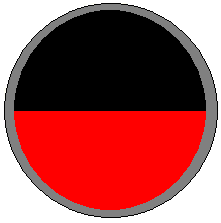
- Unit colour patch

The 2/31st Battalion was an infantry battalion of the Australian Army that served during World War II. It was raised in June 1940 and was assigned to the 25th Brigade, 7th Division. It initially served in the United Kingdom where it undertook defensive duties before being moved to the Middle East in 1941. After taking part in the fighting in Syria and Lebanon, the battalion undertook garrison duties around Tripoli before being transferred back to Australia in 1942. In late 1942 the battalion was sent to New Guinea to fight against the Japanese along the Kokoda Track. They subsequently fought a number of battles throughout 1942, 1943 and early 1944. Their last campaign came in mid-1945 when they landed on Borneo. After the war the battalion was disbanded in March 1946.

== History ==
=== Formation ===
The battalion was formed in the United Kingdom on 27 June 1940 from Second Australian Imperial Force (2nd AIF) personnel that had originally been designated for service in non-infantry roles who were grouped together to form an infantry battalion. Initially designated as the "70th Battalion", due to manpower shortages at first it was composed of only three rifle companies instead of the normal establishment of four. (Note: The designation of 70th Battalion was chosen originally because it seemed a logical progression, as there had been 69 battalions of the First Australian Imperial Force which had been raised during World War I.) Many personnel were drawn from the 2/1st Anti-Tank Regiment at this time. Under the command of Lieutenant Colonel Horace Strutt the battalion was initially based at Tidworth. In August 1940, Strutt was replaced with Lieutenant Colonel Ragnar Garrett as commanding officer. In October 1940, the battalion's designation was changed to the "2/31st Battalion" (Note: The numerical designation of 2nd AIF units was prefixed by "2/", which was used to set them apart from Militia units with corresponding numerical designations.) in order to bring it in line with the designations of the rest of the 2nd AIF, and it moved to Colchester. In November, the battalion was assigned to the 25th Brigade. It was during this time the battalion suffered its first casualty, when one of its members was killed in a German air raid. While in England the battalion undertook training and was employed on defensive duties, guarding against a possible invasion by German forces.

The circumstances of the battalion's establishment overseas resulted in the situation of the battalion's personnel being issued two different Unit colour patches (UCP). Personnel who were in the United Kingdom at the end of 1940 were issued with a circular UCP consisting of black over red, with a border of grey. However, this UCP was issued without reference to Army Headquarters in Australia, who issued battalion reinforcements in Australia with a UCP consisting of an upright brown and yellow rectangle inside a grey circle: this was intended to link the battalion to the 31st Battalion, which had served during World War I. Upon arrival in the Middle East, though, these patches were replaced with the black and red patches.

=== Middle East ===
In January 1941, with the threat of invasion of England reduced, it was decided to send the 2nd AIF units there to the Middle East and the battalion arrived in Egypt in March 1941. Following this the battalion moved to Palestine where it undertook further training and received a draft of reinforcements which enabled it to raise a fourth company in order to bring it up to establishment. Having been transferred to the 7th Division, the battalion took up defensive positions around Mersa Matruh before taking part in the Syria-Lebanon campaign, during which it took part in several battles.

The first of these came in early June, when the battalion captured the town of Khirbe in Lebanon, before advancing towards Jezzine. On 13 June, the 2/31st, supported by a troop from the 7th Division Cavalry Regiment, crossed the Litani River bridge and led the advance. Coming under fire from Vichy French troops on the hills overlooking the town, the battalion suffered a number of casualties, including its commanding officer, Lieutenant Colonel Selwyn Porter. After clearing the French from the main position around Green Hill, Jezzine was finally secured. Between 15 and 29 June, the French brought up reinforcements and subsequently launched a series of counterattacks against the Australians. On 17 June, a French attack at Jezzine was repulsed. The 2/31st then launched an unsuccessful attack on "Hill 1332", a key feature in the area, during which they lost seven killed and 22 wounded. The following day a further 17 men were killed when French aircraft attacked the battalion's positions around the Hotel Egypt. Throughout the rest of the month, fighting continued around Jezzine until on 29 June the Vichy French began to withdraw.

In early July the 2/31st commenced operations to the north of Jezzine with the aim of securing the high ground around Amatour and Badarane. On the night of 9/10 July they advanced up steep terrain under the cover of a heavy artillery barrage. During the fighting that followed, one of the battalion's members, Private James Gordon, performed the deeds for which he subsequently received the Victoria Cross, crawling forward and single-handedly attacking a French post that was holding up his company's advance.

On 12 July an armistice was signed between the Allies and the Vichy French. Following this, the battalion established itself at Amchite where they undertook occupation duties until mid-September when the 25th Brigade received orders to move to Tripoli. The 2/31st Battalion was assigned the task of fortifying Jebel Tourbel, about 10 miles (16 km) north of Tripoli. Upon completion of this task, the battalion undertook defensive duties there until February 1942.

=== New Guinea campaigns 1942–1944 ===
Due to concerns about the entry of Japan into the war in the Pacific, the battalion was brought back to Australia in early 1942. Departing Port Tewfik on 9 February on the MV Vernon, the battalion arrived at Port Adelaide, South Australia, on 9 March and moved to Camp Woodside. In early April they conducted a road and rail move to Casino, New South Wales, where a weeks' leave was granted before moving on to Caboolture, Queensland. During this time the battalion undertook defensive duties securing the northern approach to Brisbane during the Battle of the Coral Sea. From June they began jungle training in preparation for deployment to New Guinea in September where the units of the Militia had been fighting a delaying campaign against the Japanese along the Kokoda Track.

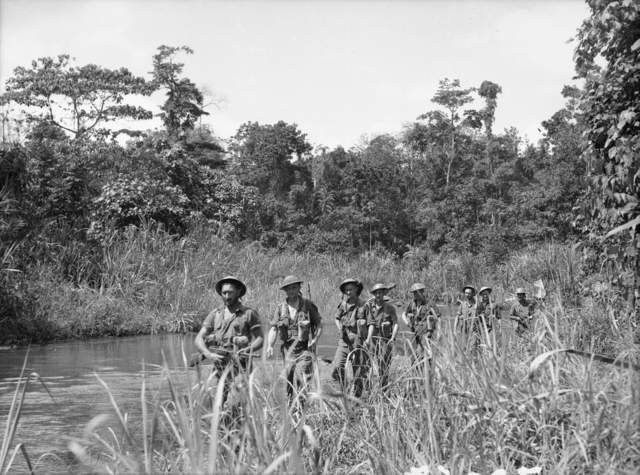
A patrol from the 2/31st Battalion passing along the Brown River in Papua during October 1942

On 31 August, under the command of Lieutenant Colonel Colin Dunbar, the battalion was moved to Brisbane where they embarked upon the Cremer bound for Port Moresby. Arriving there on 9 September, the battalion received orders to proceed towards the Owen Stanley Range. They arrived at Ioribaiwa on 15 September, however, almost as soon as they arrived they were forced to pull back to Imita Ridge. The Japanese, however, had exhausted their supply lines and were unable to follow and thus the Australian force was able to begin its own advance. On 1 November, the 2/31st was in the vanguard as it entered the village of Kokoda. Following this, Dunbar handed over command of the battalion to Lieutenant Colonel James Miller, and under his command the battalion took part in significant battles at Gorari and Gona. In December, however, Miller died from scrub typhus, and as the casualties from combat and disease mounted the battalion was eventually withdrawn from the fighting to Port Moresby from where it embarked to return to Australia in January 1943. By the end of the battalion's involvement in the campaign, only 55 men were fit for duty.

Following six months of training and re-organisation in Australia, the 2/31st returned to New Guinea in July 1943 where, under the command of Lieutenant Colonel Murray Robson who had previously served as second in command, they took part in the Salamaua-Lae campaign, before carrying out patrolling operations through the Markham Valley and into the Finisterre Range as part of the Finisterre Range campaign. After having been relieved by the 24th Battalion in January 1944, the 2/31st was once again withdrawn to Australia, arriving there in February to reconstitute and train for the next phase of the war.

=== Borneo 1945 ===
After this the battalion spent over a year training on the Atherton Tablelands in Queensland before moving to Morotai and then later taking part in the landing at Balikpapan along with the rest of the 7th Division in one of the last Australian campaigns of the war. Landing at Green Beach on 2 July 1945, the second day of the operation, the 2/31st went ashore unopposed and moved inland, taking up positions in the centre of the Australian line around a location called "Ration". After establishing themselves on the hill, later in the day they were struck by airburst artillery before commencing clearing patrols and occupying a smaller feature known as "Resort". The following day the battalion commenced operations along the Milford Highway, as the Japanese began to withdraw towards Batuchampar. Attacking Japanese positions around the "Nobody" and "Nurse" features, the 2/31st encountered heavy opposition from the Japanese defenders. Having lost 50 men killed or wounded, the battalion occupied the positions on 4 July, after the Japanese withdrew, having lost 63 killed.

Following this, the Australians advanced along the open country along the Milford Highway. Relying heavily upon direct and indirect fire support to suppress the Japanese positions along the numerous ridges that lay astride the axis of advance, the going was slow. By 9 July the open country of the coast turned to thick bush and the Australians began to encounter improvised explosive devices and booby traps in the scrub. Early on 10 July, a company from the 2/31st Battalion launched a successful attack which saw them capture 12 3-inch naval guns that were being used as part of the Japanese defensive system for the loss of five wounded. Late in the afternoon, while fighting around the "Coke" feature, the battalion suffered a serious setback when a company was ambushed, resulting in 18 killed and 23 wounded.

A brief period of inactivity followed before the advance continued. On 26 July, as a result of the casualties that they had suffered earlier in the month, the battalion was withdrawn from the fighting and moved to the rear. Although they undertook security duties, they did not see action again before the war ended on 15 August 1945. During the fighting around Balikpapan the 2/31st Battalion suffered the highest number of casualties of any Allied unit deployed in the Borneo campaign, losing 44 men killed and 134 wounded. (Note: Long provides the figure of 168 killed and wounded, without providing a breakdown. Johnston provides the figure of 33 men killed, 11 died of wounds and 134 wounded in action.)

=== Disbandment ===
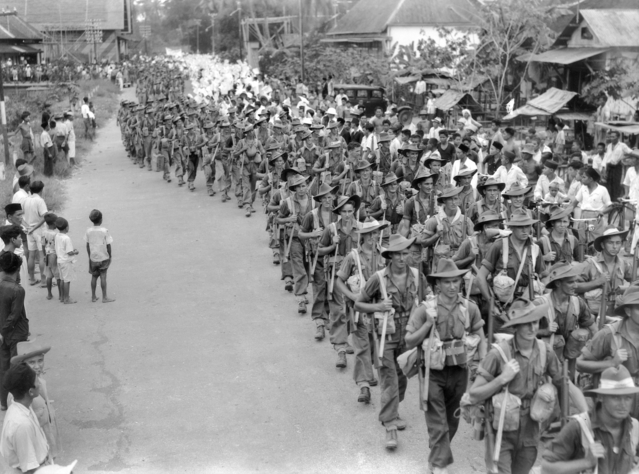
Soldiers of 2/31st Battalion passing through Bandjermasin on 17 September 1945 to an enthusiastic welcome from local civilians

Following the end of the war, the battalion remained in Borneo. Initially they were stationed around Bandjermasin where they undertook garrison duties, but in October 1945 they were moved to Balikpapan. At this time, the demobilisation process began and some of the battalion's long serving personnel were offered the opportunity to return to Australia. Others were transferred to the 65th Battalion, which was being raised as part of the Australian contribution to the British Commonwealth Occupation Force. On 31 January 1946, the remaining personnel embarked upon HMAS Kanimbla, for the return to Australia. They landed in Brisbane in February 1946, where the battalion was disbanded early the following month.

During the course of the war a total of 2,660 men served in the 2/31st Battalion of whom 251 were killed or died and 479 wounded. (Note: There is some discrepancy in these figures to those provided by Johnston, who lists 190 men killed, 37 died of wounds, 13 died on active service and 471 wounded in action out of a total of 2,660 members.) Members of the battalion received the following decorations: one Victoria Cross, three Distinguished Service Orders, four Military Crosses, one Distinguished Conduct Medal, 20 Military Medals and 25 Mentions in Despatches. (Note: There is some discrepancy in these figures to those provided by Johnston who lists one VC, three DSOs, four MCs, two DCMs, 20 MMs and 26 MIDs.)

== Battle honours ==
The 2/31st Battalion received 22 battle honours for its service during World War II. These honours are:

- Syria 1941, Syrian Frontier, Merjayun, Jezzine, Damour, Hill 1069, Baradene, South-West Pacific 1942–1945, Kokoda Trail, Ioribaiwa, Eora Creek–Templeton's Crossing II, Oivi–Gorari, Buna–Gona, Gona, Lae–Nadzab, Lae Road, Liberation of Australian New Guinea, Ramu Valley, Shaggy Ridge, Borneo 1945, Balikpapan, Milford Highway. (Note: In 1948, when the Citizens Military Force was re-raised, these battle honours were passed to the 31st Battalion. This battalion eventually became part of the Royal Queensland Regiment and today the 2/31st Battalion's battle honours are maintained by the 31st/42nd Battalion, Royal Queensland Regiment.)

== Commanding officers ==
The following officers served as commanding officer of the 2/31st Battalion:

- Lieutenant Colonel Horace Strutt (1940);
- Lieutenant Colonel Ragnar Garrett (1940–41);
- Lieutenant Colonel Selwyn Porter (1941);
- Lieutenant Colonel Reg Pollard (1941);
- Lieutenant Colonel Selwyn Porter (1941–42);
- Lieutenant Colonel Colin Dunbar (1942);
- Lieutenant Colonel James Miller (1942);
- Lieutenant Colonel Murray Robson (1942–46).

== Notes ==
Footnotes

Citations
