= 2/33rd Battalion (Australia) =

Former infantry battalion of the Australian Army

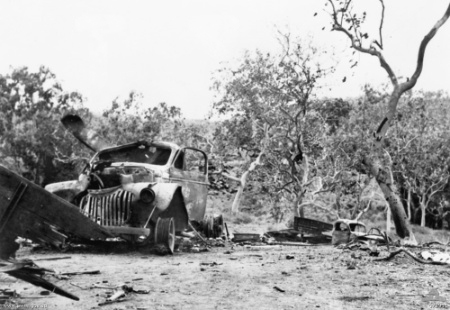
- Burnt out vehicles at Jackson's Airfield, where the 2/33rd suffered one third of its wartime casualties
- Active: 1940–1946
- Country: Australia
- Branch: Australian Army
- Type: Infantry
- Size: ~800–900 personnel (Note: By the start of the Second World War, the authorised strength of an Australian infantry battalion was 910 men all ranks, however, later in the war it fell to 803.)
- Part of: 25th Brigade, 7th Division
- Colours: Brown over red
- Engagements: Second World War: Syria–Lebanon campaign; New Guinea campaign; Borneo campaign

Insignia
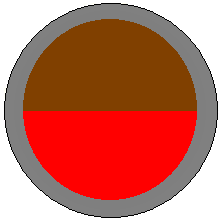
- Unit colour patch

The 2/33rd Battalion was an infantry battalion of the Australian Army during the Second World War. It was formed as part of the Second Australian Imperial Force in the United Kingdom in June 1940 as the "72nd Battalion" to create the 25th Brigade, which eventually became part of the 7th Division. After the threat of invasion had passed, the battalion was transferred to the Middle East in early 1941, and after a period of garrison duty in the Western Desert, the battalion fought against the Vichy French in the invasion of Syria and Lebanon.

Later, in early 1942, in response to Japan's entry to the war, the battalion was transferred back to Australia and after a period of re-organisation and training it was sent to New Guinea where it took part in the Kokoda Track campaign. Arriving at the height of the fighting, after the Japanese advance stalled it took part in the pursuit of Japanese forces to the northern coast, fighting around the beachheads at Buna–Gona. In 1943, after returning to Australia for six months to refit, the battalion was committed to the Salamaua–Lae campaign, and then the Ramu Valley–Finisterre Range campaign. Returning to Australia in early 1944, a long period of inactivity followed before the 2/33rd undertook its last campaign in Borneo in the final months of the war. The battalion was disbanded in Brisbane in March 1946.

== History ==
=== Formation in the United Kingdom ===
Raised on 27 June 1940, as part of the 25th Brigade, the battalion was initially designated the 72nd Battalion, as a continuation of the numbers assigned to the infantry battalions of the Australian Imperial Force, which had been raised during the First World War. One of three Australian infantry battalions established in the United Kingdom during the early months of the war – the others being 2/31st and 2/32nd Battalions – it was formed from surplus Australian infantry reinforcements and support corps personnel – drawn from all Australian states, these personnel had originally been assigned to the 6th Division – who were sent to bolster the garrison following the Fall of France when the threat of invasion loomed. Understrength and lacking support personnel and large amounts of specialist equipment, the battalion initially consisted of only three rifle companies, each consisting of three platoons. The companies were designated 'A' to 'C', while the platoons were numerically designated 1 through to 9. This was one rifle company short of the standard establishment of the time, and at the time the battalion had a strength of just over 460 personnel, well below its authorised strength of around 900. In addition, the battalion headquarters company, which consisted of six platoons – signals, anti-aircraft, mortars, carrier, pioneer, and transport – was also understrength, and lacked a large amount of specialist equipment at the outset.

Commanded by Lieutenant Colonel Rudolph Bierwirth, in September, the battalion was issued with a circular brown over red unit colour patch (UCP), with a border of grey to denote that the battalion was a 2nd AIF unit. However, the circumstances of the battalion's establishment overseas resulted in the situation of the battalion's personnel being issued two different UCPs. Personnel who were in the United Kingdom at the end of 1940 were issued with the brown over red UCP. However, this UCP was issued without reference to Army Headquarters in Australia, who issued battalion reinforcements in Australia with a UCP consisting of a black over green oval in a circle of grey: this was intended to link the battalion to the 33rd Battalion, which had served during the First World War. Upon arrival in the Middle East, though, these patches were replaced with the brown and red patches.

In October, the unit moved from Tidworth to Colchester and around the same time it was redesignated as the 2/33rd Battalion, (Note: The numerical designation of 2nd AIF units was prefixed by "2/", which was used to set them apart from Militia units with corresponding numerical designations.) to bring it into line with the other battalions of the Second Australian Imperial Force. At Colchester, the Australians undertook a period of intensive training which was followed by defensive duties amidst the backdrop of the ongoing Battle of Britain, which took place in the skies overhead. During this time, the battalion was allocated the role of mobile reserve, assigned the task of counter-attacking around Harwich in the event of a German invasion; in this role they undertook further training operating with and against tanks, with British armoured vehicles and crews being assigned to the battalion during training exercises.

=== Garrison duties in North Africa and fighting in Syria ===
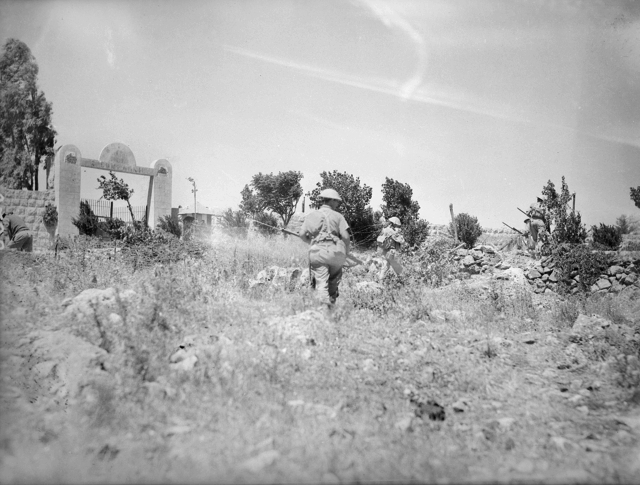
Troops from the 2/33rd attack Fort Khiam, June 1941

By the end of 1940, the threat of invasion had dissipated and the Australian troops that had been sent to the United Kingdom were transferred to the Middle East. Travelling by train from Colchester to Glasgow in January 1941, the main body of the battalion embarked upon the transport Nea Hellas and sailed via Freetown and Durban. They reached Egypt in early March 1941 where the 25th Brigade, was assigned to the 7th Division. Moving to a camp in Palestine, the battalion's fourth rifle company – designated 'D' Company – was taken on strength, having previously been formed at Beit Jirja in September 1940 from excess reinforcements from the 6th Division. At the time, the 7th Division was preparing to go to Greece, to follow in the wake of the 6th Division; however, the entry of the Afrika Korps into the fighting in the Western Desert and early German successes prompted their movement to the fortress at Mersa Metruh, to guard against a possible German advance into Egypt from Libya.

The 2/33rd remained at Mersa Metruh, undertaking defensive duties, until May 1941, but did not see combat. After this, the 7th Division began to prepare for an invasion of Vichy French-held Syria and Lebanon. A short-lived campaign, from early June until mid-July, the 2/33rd took part in the fighting around Merdjayoun – attacking Fort Khiam in the early stages of the campaign – and Jezzine, fighting mainly in disparate company groups. Following the French capitulation, the battalion undertook garrison duties in Lebanon as part of the Allied occupation force established there to defend against a possible German invasion through Turkey; in September the battalion occupied a position around the port of Tripoli. They remained there until early 1942 when the Australian government requested the return of the 7th Division to Australia, following Japan's entry into the war. The battalion's role, and indeed that of the whole 7th Division, in the fighting against the Vichy French was largely censored at the time due to concerns about negative public opinion in Australia and the battalion's historian, William Crooks, notes that later this caused some friction between 7th Division personnel and those from the 6th and 9th Divisions, and a general lack of public awareness of what they had done. Casualties sustained by the battalion in Syria and Lebanon numbered 21 dead, 84 wounded and 26 captured.

=== Fighting against the Japanese in New Guinea ===
Embarking on the Mt Vernon in Port Tewfik, the battalion sailed from Egypt in early February and arrived in Adelaide, South Australia, in mid-March. After this, the battalion camped at Woodside, in the Adelaide Hills, where a period of re-conditioning and exercises followed until mid-April when the majority of its personnel were sent on home leave. At the end of the month, those that remained undertook a five-day train journey to Casino, New South Wales. Limited training was undertaken until mid-May, around which time orders were received for another move, this time to Caboolture, Queensland. By the end of the month, the battalion returned to almost full strength when the final leave draft returned. At the time, the strategic situation in the Pacific was in the balance; the Japanese were advancing south and due to concerns about a possible Japanese invasion, the 25th Brigade was tasked with defending the coastal area north of Brisbane.

In late August 1942, the 2/33rd deployed to New Guinea, where the Kokoda Track campaign was reaching its climax as the Japanese advanced on Port Moresby. Embarking on the Katoomba in late August, they landed at Port Moresby on 9 September. Four days later the battalion was thrown into battle against the Japanese around Ioribaiwa, leading the 25th Brigade forward. As the Japanese advance continued, the Australians withdrew back to Imita Ridge. As the 25th Brigade withdrew, the 2/33rd formed a rearguard, covering the withdrawal. After completing the movement rearwards, the battalion subsequently assumed a position in depth on the right. The Japanese then began to withdraw, having reached the limits of their supply line, and the Australians pursued them back to the beachheads on the northern coast where the Japanese had originally landed in July. Throughout October and November, the battalion fought significant engagements at Myola and Gorari, before being thrown into further fighting around Gona in late November and early December. Casualties were heavy, and by the time the Japanese beachhead had been destroyed, the battalion was withdrawn to Port Moresby, the battalion had been reduced to only two companies; early in January 1943, the main body of 2/33rd returned to Australia upon the transports Both and Duntroon. The rear detail followed in the middle of the month aboard the Taroona. Total casualties sustained by the 2/33rd during this period had included 46 dead and 121 wounded.

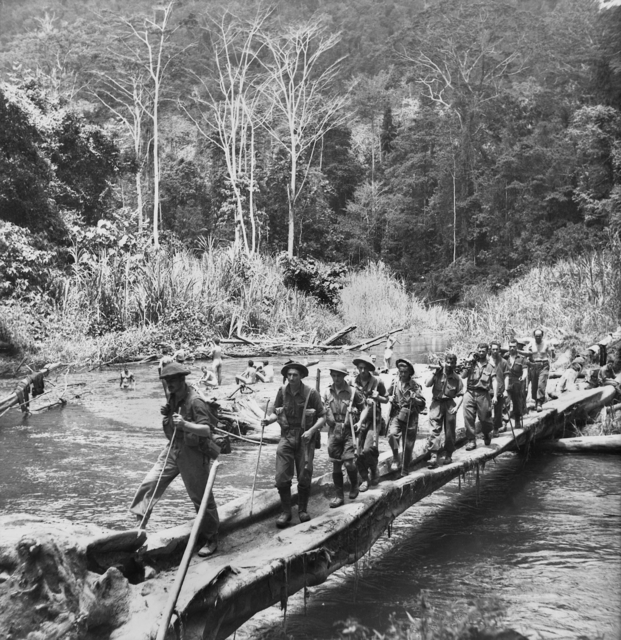
2/33rd soldiers in New Guinea, 1942

Concentrating at Ravenshoe, in Queensland, in the early months of 1943 the 2/33rd was reorganised as part of the 7th Division's conversion to the jungle divisional establishment. As a part of this, the battalion's establishment was dropped to just over 800 men and it lost its carrier platoon, receiving in its place a machine gun platoon equipped with four Vickers machine guns. In addition, the anti-aircraft platoon was re-roled as a tank-attack platoon and the transport platoon was reduced to a third, with its complement of 74 vehicles and 14 motorcycles being replaced by 25 jeeps. Following this, an intense period of training was undertaken as the battalion received a batch of around 300 reinforcements to replace its losses in New Guinea; by July it was ready to deploy once again and subsequently returned to New Guinea to join the Salamaua–Lae campaign.

Throughout the final weeks of July, the battalion was transported to Port Moresby aboard three transports: Canberra, Duntroon and Katoomba. Establishing a camp at "Pom-Pom" east of Port Moresby, the battalion spent the following month preparing for an airlift into Nadzab, in support of US paratroopers. On 7 September 1943, while the battalion's personnel waited to fly out to Nadzab from Jackson's Airfield, near Port Moresby, a heavily laden US B-24 Liberator bomber crashed into trucks carrying the battalion, killing 60 and injuring a further 92; this represented a third of the battalion's casualties for the entire war. The following day, the 2/33rd was flown into Nadzab and they subsequently took part in the capture of Lae; at the end of the month, they were transported by air to Kaipit from where they were committed to the advance up the Ramu Valley into the Finnesterre Range during which they were involved mainly in small unit actions and patrols. The battalion's casualties in New Guinea during the campaigns of 1943–1944 numbered 84 dead and 70 wounded.

=== Borneo: Final campaign and disbandment ===
In early February 1944, the battalion was withdrawn back to Australia, returning aboard the Kanimbla. A long period of training and rebuilding followed, as US forces assumed the primary responsibility for the fighting against the Japanese in the Pacific. Inter-Allied politics, coupled with a rapidly evolving strategic situation resulted in a period of operational uncertainty for the Australian Army during which there was significant ambiguity about their future employment against the Japanese. As a result, it was not until close to the end of the war that the 2/33rd went into action again. In June 1945, the battalion embarked for Morotai Island, from where they subsequently took part in the re-capture of Balikpapan the following month. During the landing, the 2/33rd formed part of the floating reserve, but after the early stages of the assault it came ashore on the second day along with the 25th Brigade's two other infantry battalions, and they assumed control of the central part of the Australian beachhead. The following day, the 25th Brigade began to advance inland up the main north-eastern axis, which the Australians dubbed the "Milford Highway". The 2/33rd took up position on the right hand side of the brigade's front, coming up against stiff Japanese resistance as it advanced around Chilton Road, but this was overcome with machine gun and artillery support, after which the advance inland continued.

A series of minor actions followed as the Australians continued their advance up the Milford Highway. After a month of fighting, the island was largely secured and following the bombing of Hiroshima and Nagasaki in early August 1945, the Japanese sued for peace and hostilities came to an end. During the fighting in Borneo the 2/33rd had lost 25 dead and 57 wounded. In the immediate aftermath of the war, the Australians remained on Borneo as an occupation force, while the Army was slowly demobilised. During this time the battalion was steadily reduced as personnel were repatriated to Australia for discharge, or were transferred to other units for further service, including providing personnel to the 34th Brigade, which was raised for occupation duties in Japan.

In February 1946, the remaining cadre returned to Australia and the following month it was disbanded in Brisbane. During the war, 3,065 men served in the battalion, while a further 588 were posted to it following the war; of these, the 2/33rd lost 200 men killed and 363 wounded. Members of the battalion received the following decorations: two Distinguished Service Orders, seven Military Crosses, 11 Military Medals and 27 Mentions in Despatches.

== Battle honours ==
For its service during the war, the 2/33rd was awarded the following battle and theatre honours:

- North Africa; Syria 1941; Syrian Frontier; Merjayun; South-West Pacific 1942–1945; Kokoda Trail; Ioribaiwa; Eora Creek–Templeton's Crossing II; Oivi–Gorari; Buna–Gona; Gona; Lae–Nadzab; Lae Road; Liberation of Australian New Guinea; Ramu Valley; Shaggy Ridge; Borneo 1945; Balikpapan; Milford Highway.

== Commanding officers ==
The following officers commanded the 2/33rd throughout the war:

- Lieutenant Colonel Rudolph Bierwirth (1940–1941)
- Lieutenant Colonel John Graham Monaghan (1941)
- Lieutenant Colonel John Armstrong Corby (1941–1942)
- Lieutenant Colonel Alfred William Buttrose (1942–1943)
- Lieutenant Colonel Thomas Richard Worgan Cotton (1943–1945)

== Notes ==
Footnotes

Citations
