= John Lloyd (brigadier) =

Australian Army officer

John Edward Lloyd
- Born: 13 April 1894; Ascot Vale, Victoria
- Died: 24 December 1965 (aged 71); Mayanup, Western Australia
- Military career
- Allegiance: Australia; United Kingdom
- Branch: Australian Army; British Indian Army
- Service years: 1914–1922; 1936–1945
- Rank: Brigadier
- Commands: 2nd Australian Prisoner of War Reception Group (1945); 16th Brigade (1942–43); 2/28th Battalion (1940–42); 16th Battalion (1939–40)
- Conflicts: First World War; Gallipoli Campaign; Second Battle of Bullecourt; Battle of Broodseinde; Third Anglo-Afghan War; Second World War; Siege of Tobruk; New Guinea Campaign
- Awards: Commander of the Order of the British Empire; Distinguished Service Order; Military Cross & Bar; Mentioned in Despatches (2)

Brigadier John Edward Lloyd, CBE, DSO, MC & Bar (13 April 1894 – 24 December 1965) was a senior Australian Army officer who fought in the First and Second World Wars.

Lloyd was commissioned in the Citizen Military Forces in January 1914 and, following the outbreak of the First World War, served at Gallipoli and later on the Western Front in France and Belgium. He was wounded during his service.

Lloyd held the rank of major in the Australian Imperial Force when he was appointed a lieutenant on probation with the British Indian Army on 25 March 1918. He was confirmed in his appointment on 25 March 1919. He was posted to the 2nd Battalion 35th Sikhs and appointed adjutant. He was promoted captain on 15 September 1919. After the disbandment of the 2nd Battalion 35th Sikhs, Lloyd was posted to the 1st Battalion 30th Punjabis. The regiment was stationed in Lahore when he was appointed staff captain, Lahore District on 5 August 1921.

Lloyd retired from the Indian Army with a gratuity as a captain on 18 August 1922. He moved to Western Australia and, after working as a farmer and administrative clerk, rejoined the Citizen Military Forces in 1936.

From 1939 to 1940 he commanded the 16th Battalion, being reassigned to the 2/28th Battalion in 1940, which he led for two years in the North African Campaign, before commanding the 16th Brigade from 1942 to 1943 in New Guinea. At war's end, Lloyd led the 2nd Australian Prisoner of War Reception Group in the recovery and repatriation of 11,000 Australian prisoners of war in Southeast Asia.
