= 25th Brigade (Australia) =

Infantry brigade of the Australian Army during World War II

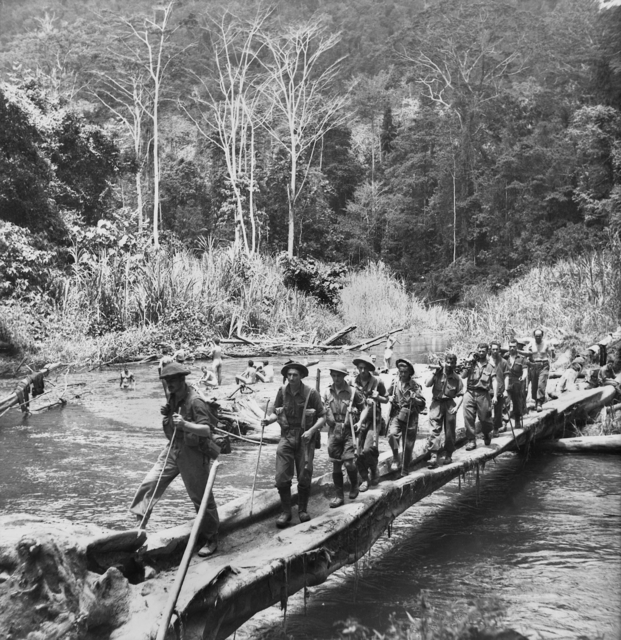
- Men from the 2/25th Battalion cross the Brown River during a patrol in October 1942
- Active: 1940–1946
- Country: Australia
- Branch: Australian Army
- Type: Infantry
- Size: ~3,500 men
- Part of: 7th Division
- Engagements: Second World War: Syria–Lebanon campaign; New Guinea campaign; Borneo campaign

Commanders
- Notable commanders: Kenneth Eather

Insignia
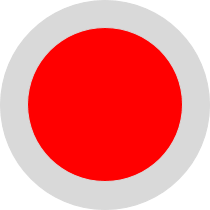
- Headquarters unit colour patch

The 25th Brigade was a brigade-sized infantry unit of the Australian Army that served during the Second World War. Raised in July 1940 and consisting of three infantry battalions, the 25th Brigade initially served in the United Kingdom, where it formed part of the garrison tasked with defending against a possible German invasion. In 1941, the brigade was redeployed to the Middle East where it took part in the Syria–Lebanon campaign fighting several actions around Merdjayoun and Jezzine.

Following Japan's entry into the war, the 25th Brigade was transferred back to Australia and subsequently took part in the fighting in New Guinea. Throughout 1942–1943, the brigade fought in the final stages of the Kokoda Track campaign and around Buna–Gona. Later, they took part in the fighting around Lae and Shaggy Ridge, before being withdrawn to Australia for a long period of rest and reorganisation. In 1945, the 25th Brigade was committed to the Borneo campaign, carrying out an amphibious landing at Balikpapan in July 1945 before being disbanded in 1946.

== History ==
The 25th Brigade was raised in June 1940 from Second Australian Imperial Force (AIF) personnel in the United Kingdom. Upon formation, the brigade's headquarters was opened at Tidworth, in Wiltshire. The brigade was created following the Fall of France, initially as a temporary formation that would defend southern England, in the event of an invasion by German forces. It had an foundational establishment of 1,759 personnel; a majority were drawn from service support corps of the 6th Division, although roughly a quarter of this number were diverted from infantry reinforcements bound initially for AIF units in the Middle East. Upon formation, the brigade consisted of only three infantry battalions instead of the four that had been the usual Australian establishment up to that time, due to manpower shortages and its component units were the 70th, 71st and 72nd Battalions, although these were later re-designated as the 2/31st, 2/32nd and 2/33rd Battalions. When formed, each of these battalions consisted of only three companies, instead of the usual four, although these companies were later added when the brigade deployed to the Middle East after January 1941.

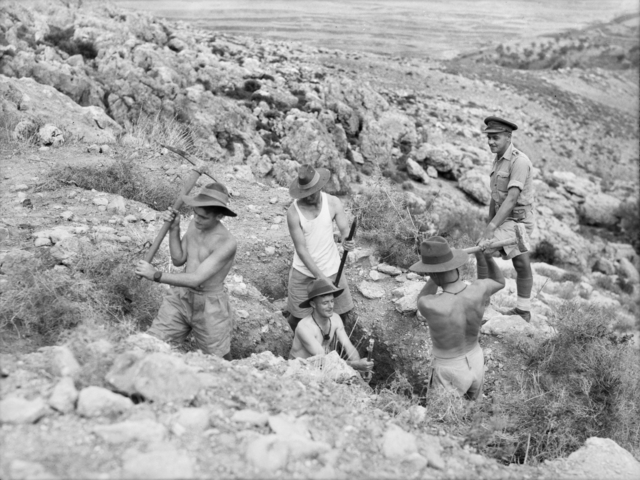
Men from the 2/31st Battalion dig a section defence post in Syria, 1941

Originally, the 25th Brigade was part of the newly established 9th Division, however, after being dispatched to the Middle East in 1941 it was transferred to the 7th Division, with which it remained for the rest of the war. Upon arrival, the brigade was sent to Palestine, although it moved to Ikingi Maryut, in Egypt, in April 1941 as preparations were made to deploy to Greece, in support of the 6th Division. However, in response to German moves in North Africa, the brigade was deployed to Mersa Matruh in the Western Desert, remaining there until relieved in May. By this time, the brigade's establishment was completed, and it consisted of 3,500 men and was composed of the 2/25th, 2/31st and 2/33rd Battalions, with the 2/32nd having been transferred to the 24th Brigade and the 2/25th being re-assigned to the 25th in its stead as part of a re-organisation of the 2nd AIF as the more combat ready units were shifted to the 7th Division in preparation for operations, while those still forming were transferred to the 9th Division.

After this the brigade took part in the Syria–Lebanon campaign in June–July 1941, fighting against the Vichy French. During this campaign, the brigade was allocated to the centre of the Allied advance, with the 21st Brigade advancing on its flank along the coast. The campaign was short, but hard fought and the brigade's major actions during this time included an attack on Merdjayoun and fighting around Jezzine. After the armistice was signed in July, the 25th Brigade moved to Beirut where they undertook garrison duties. A further move took place in September, when the brigade was transferred to Tripoli to construct defensive positions. They remained there until January 1942, when the 25th Brigade was withdrawn to Julius, in Palestine.

In early 1942, following Japan's entry into the war and concerns about the strategic situation in the Pacific, the 25th Brigade—along with the rest of the 7th Division—were brought back to Australia to help reinforce the Militia units that were trying to hold back the Japanese advance in New Guinea. Arriving in Adelaide, in South Australia, the 25th Brigade's personnel were granted a brief period of leave before the brigade reconstituted around Casino, New South Wales, where they took over the defences from the 15th Motor Regiment amidst concerns of a Japanese invasion. In May, the brigade moved to Caboolture, Queensland, and assumed a defensive role around the beaches of the Sunshine Coast. As the fighting between Japanese and Australian forces along the Kokoda Track intensified, the brigade received orders to deploy to New Guinea, and they subsequently arrived in Port Moresby in September 1942.

As the situation was dire for the Australians, upon arrival at Port Moresby, the 25th Brigade was committed to the Kokoda Track campaign, and was sent up the track to Ioribaiwa, where they reinforced the heavily depleted 21st Brigade. After heavy fighting, a withdrawal was undertaken to Imita Ridge, and by the end of the month the Japanese advance towards Port Moresby had reached its limit. After this, the Japanese began to withdraw north, and the Australians began a tentative pursuit. This saw the 25th Brigade involved in heavy fighting around Eora Creek and Templeton's Crossing in October, which was followed by the recapture of Kokoda on 2 November. Following the occupation of Kokoda, the 25th Brigade began the advance towards Wairopi. The Japanese had established strong defences around Oivi and Gorari, and while the 21st Brigade carried out a frontal assault, the 25th Brigade advanced further to the south and then attacked the Japanese rear. The Japanese then withdrew across the Kumusi River, after which the 25th Brigade continued towards the coasts, joining the fighting around Gona. At Gona they came up against a well entrenched force, and suffered heavy casualties. As a result, the brigade was withdrawn to Donadabu in December 1942 and then flown back to Australia the following month.

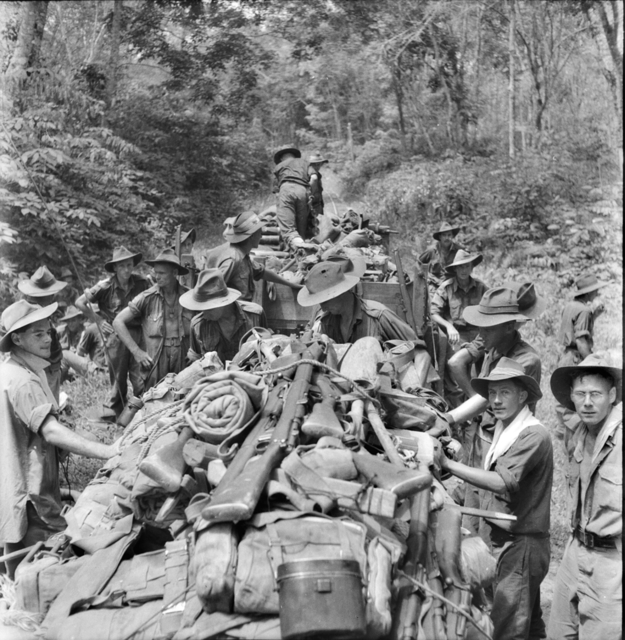
Troops from the 2/32nd Battalion on Borneo, July 1945

A six month period of home service in Australia followed, during which intensive training was carried out around Ravenshoe, Queensland, on the Atherton Tableands. In September 1943, the brigade was committed to the capture of Lae, as the 7th Division was flown into Nadzab to begin the advance from there, while the 9th Division carried out another advance on Lae from the coast. While emplaning in Port Moresby, the 2/33rd Battalion suffered heavy losses when a Liberator bomber crashed on take off amongst trucks carrying members of the battalion. Nevertheless, the brigade arrived in Nadzab and on 9 September began their advance through the Markham Valley and after clashes around Jensen's and Heath's Plantations, the brigade entered Lae on 16 September. Following the capture of Lae, the brigade was flown to Kaiapit and the took part in the advance through the Finisterre Range, culminating in the Battle of Shaggy Ridge. After being relieved in early 1944 by the 15th Brigade, the 25th was withdrawn to Port Moresby in January 1944 and returned to Australia the following month.

After this, the 25th Brigade did not see action for over a year. During this period, the brigade was located initially at Strathpine, Queensland, before moving to Kairi as they undertook training in Queensland before taking part in the final western Allied amphibious operation of the war—the landing at Balikpapan in July 1945. This operation was part of the wider Borneo campaign. The strategic value of this campaign has since been questioned, however, ultimately the 25th Brigade's involvement in it was successful and it proved their last involvement in the war. Staging out of Morotai, the brigade landed at Balikpapan in July, following the 18th and 21st Brigades ashore. Advancing up the Milford Highway, the brigade advanced towards Batuchampar, and by the end of the month the Australians began mopping up operations. The Japanese surrendered in August 1945, after which the brigade served as occupation troops in Dutch Borneo until civilian authorities could be re-established. The brigade was disbanded shortly thereafter in 1946.
