= Arthur Allen (general) =

Australian Army general (1894–1959)

Arthur Samuel Allen
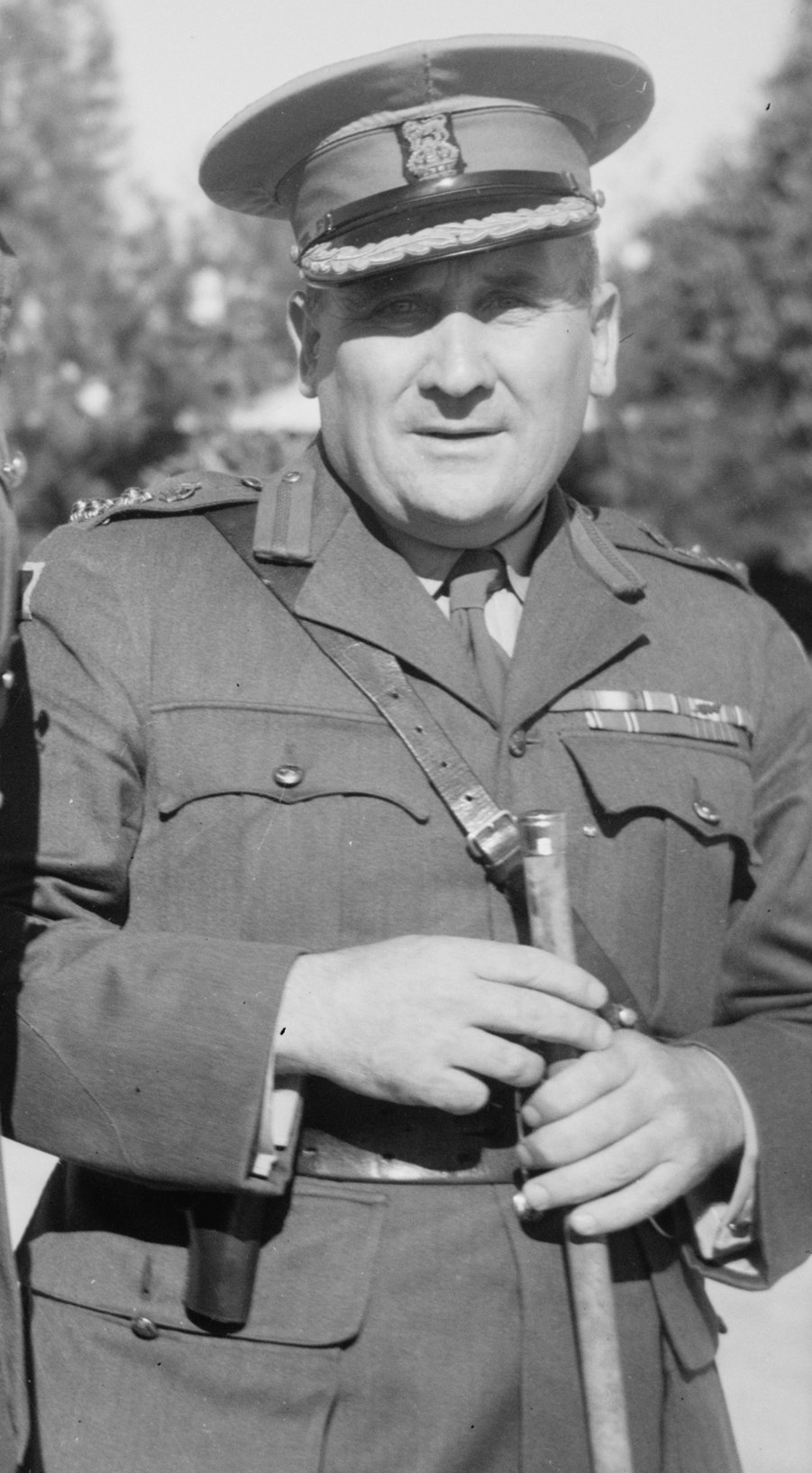
- Allen in Palestine, February 1940
- Born: 10 March 1894; Hurstville, New South Wales
- Died: 25 January 1959 (aged 64); Concord, New South Wales
- Military career
- Allegiance: Australia
- Branch: Australian Army
- Service years: 1913–1945
- Rank: Major General
- Nickname: Tubby
- Unit: 48th Battalion (1915–18)
- Commands: Northern Territory Force (1943–44); 7th Division (1941–42); 16th Brigade (1939–41); 14th Brigade (1933–39); 13th Battalion (1918–19)
- Conflicts: First World War; Gallipoli Campaign; Western Front; Battle of Pozières; Battle of the Somme; Battle of Messines; Second World War; North African Campaign; Operation Compass; Greek campaign; Battle of Tempe Gorge; Syria–Lebanon campaign; Battle of Damour; New Guinea campaign; Kokoda Track campaign; Second Battle of Eora Creek – Templeton's Crossing
- Awards: Companion of the Order of the Bath; Commander of the Order of the British Empire; Distinguished Service Order; Volunteer Decoration; Mentioned in Despatches (2); Croix de Guerre (France); War Cross, 1st Class (Greece)
- Other work: Associate of Commonwealth Institute of Accountants, June 1922; Fellow, Institute of Chartered Accountants in Australia; Director of companies

Major General Arthur Samuel "Tubby" Allen, CB, CBE, DSO, VD (10 March 1894 – 25 January 1959) was an Australian Army officer and accountant. During the Second World War he reached the rank of major general and commanded Allied forces in the Syria–Lebanon and New Guinea campaigns. Allen was frequently referred to during the Second World War by the nickname "Tubby"; an indication of his stocky build and the affection with which he was regarded by both soldiers and the Australian public.

== Early life ==
Allen was born in Hurstville, in Sydney. He attended Hurstville Superior Public School before gaining work as an audit clerk with the New South Wales Government Railways. Allen also joined the cadets and then the 39th Battalion of the Militia.

== First World War ==
Allen was commissioned in 1913 and joined the Australian Imperial Force (AIF) on 24 June 1915. Allen embarked for Egypt with reinforcements for the 13th Battalion in August. In March 1916 he was promoted to captain and assigned to the 45th Battalion. He arrived in France on 8 June 1916 and fought at the Battle of Pozières in August. Allen remained in the front line on the Somme into 1917 and led his men through the Battle of Messines in June. His leadership amidst heavy losses earned Allen the Distinguished Service Order (DSO) and a promotion to major in July. The citation for his DSO reads:

For conspicuous gallantry and devotion to duty. He led his company with great dash and determination against enemy trenches, through heavy artillery and machine-gun barrage, and against a stubborn resistance of the garrison, of whom he captured 100 prisoners. He continued to rally and lead his men to the attack, gaining further ground by his aggressive spirit and setting a fine example of initiative and organising ability.

He continued to lead men in combat, at the Battle of Dernancourt in April 1918, and then as an acting lieutenant colonel, in charge of the 48th Battalion, at Battle of Monument Wood.

In June 1918, Allen went to England to attend the Senior Officers' Course at Aldershot. Less than two weeks after the war ended – at the age of 24 – he was promoted to lieutenant colonel and given command of the 13th Battalion. He was awarded the French Croix de Guerre for his service on the Western Front. His appointment with the AIF ended on 10 November 1919.

== Between the wars ==
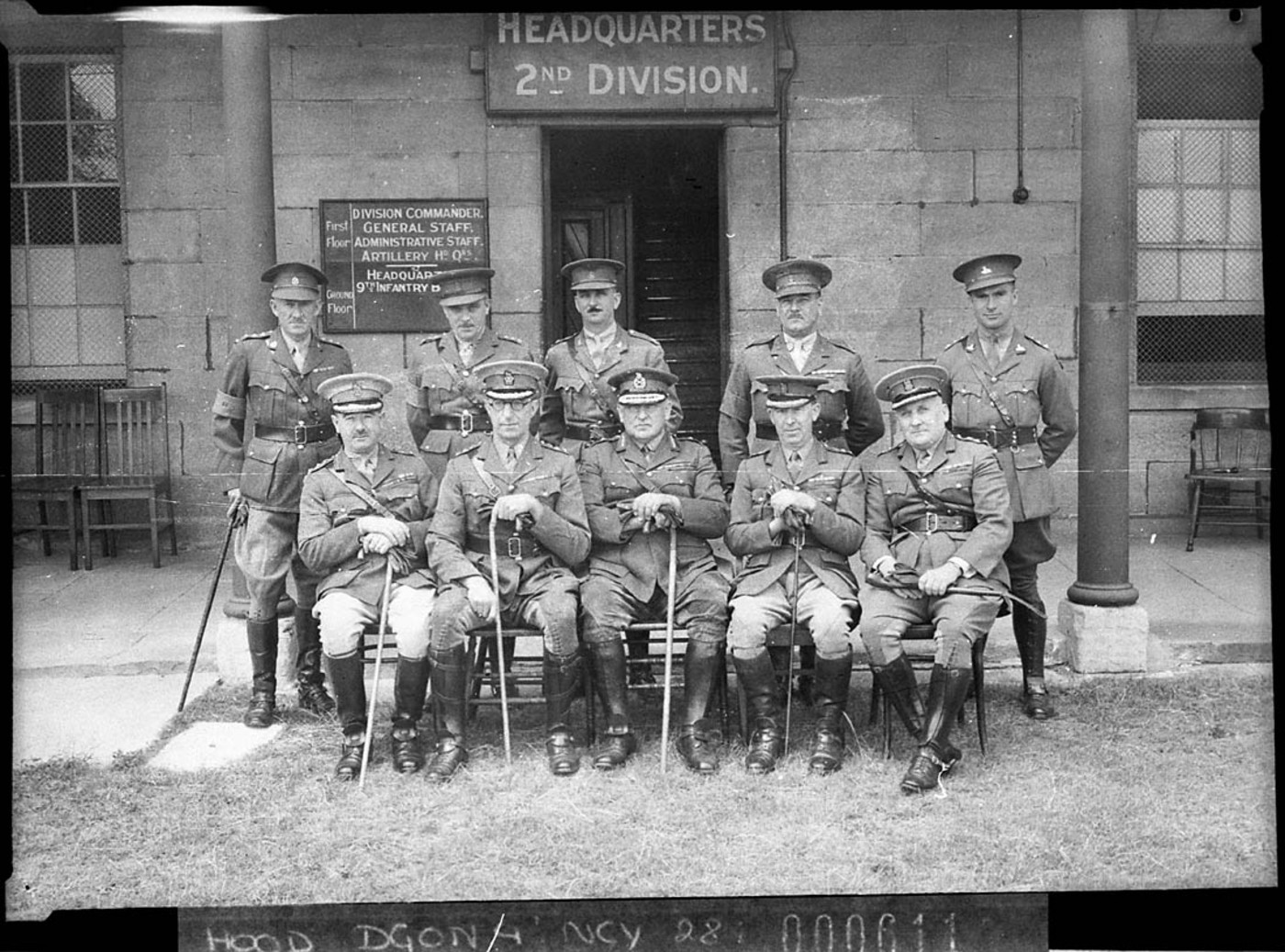
Group of staff officers of the 2nd Division at Victoria Barracks, Paddington, January 1937. Sat on the extreme right in the front row is Colonel Arthur Allen.

Allen became an accountant after the war and in December 1921 married Agnes Blair. Allen returned to accounting, but remained active in the Militia, initially in command of the 41st Battalion AMF. In 1933 he became a full colonel, in charge of the 14th Brigade. Five years later, in 1938, he became a brigadier.

== Second World War ==
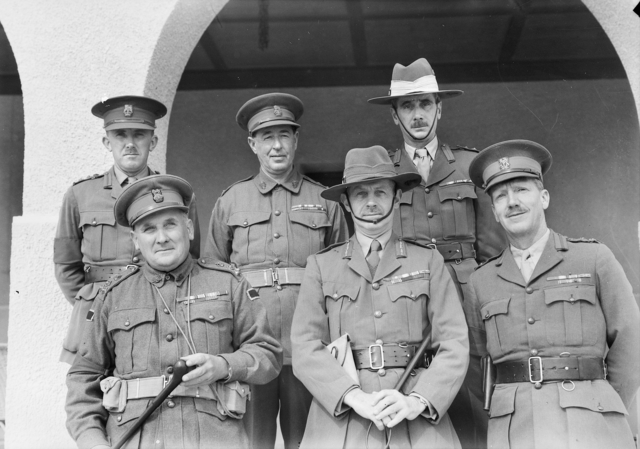
Major General Iven Mackay and his senior officers. Brigadier Allen is in the front row, at left.

In October 1939, Allen was given command of the 16th Brigade in the 6th Division as part of the Second Australian Imperial Force. Later in 1940, Allen was in North Africa, where his brigade fought at Bardia and Tobruk. In March, Allen and the brigade left North Africa for the ill-fated Greek campaign, following which he was awarded the Greek War Cross. For his services in North Africa, Allen was appointed a Commander of the Order of the British Empire in April 1941, and a Companion of the Order of the Bath in July the same year.

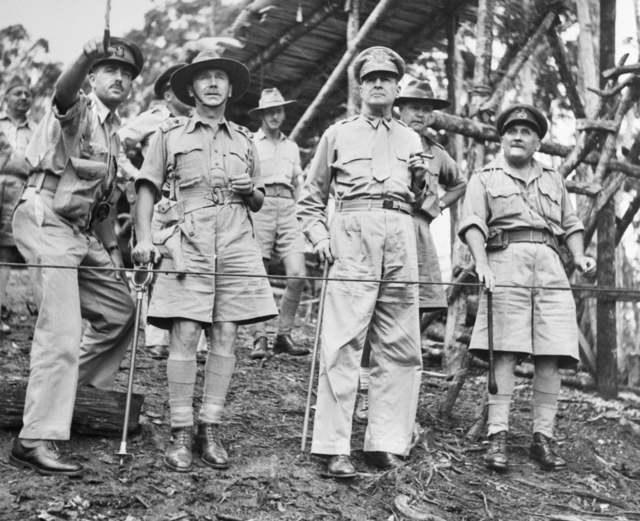
Allen (right) in Papua with General Douglas MacArthur (centre) and Lieutenant General Edmund Herring (left).

Allen was then given command of the 7th Division, and commanded it in the invasion of Syria and Lebanon, against Vichy French forces. Allen was officially promoted to major general in August 1941.

Following the outbreak of war with Japan, Allen returned to Australia in March 1942, and in August took charge of operations against the Japanese advance along the Kokoda Track. Although he was successful, Allen nevertheless came under what many consider unfair criticism from the Allied commander in the South West Pacific Area, U.S. General Douglas MacArthur and the Allied land forces commander, the Australian General Sir Thomas Blamey, for moving too slowly in pursuit of the Japanese across the Owen Stanley Ranges. He was relieved of his command on 29 October 1942. Lesser appointments followed, but in October 1944, Blamey recommended Allen be made a Knight Commander of the Order of the British Empire, although Allen was never appointed.

== Later life ==
After the war Allen became a senior partner in a Sydney accountancy firm. He died on 25 January 1959 and was given a military funeral before being cremated. He was survived by his wife and two sons. The art critic Christopher Allen and the writer, performer and filmmaker Richard James Allen are his grandsons.

== See also ==
- List of Australian Army generals

Military offices
Preceded by Major General Jack Stevens	General Officer Commanding Northern Territory Force; 1943–1944	Succeeded by Brigadier Robert Nimmo (acting)
Preceded by Major General John Lavarack	General Officer Commanding 7th Division; 1941–1942	Succeeded by Major General George Vasey
