= Second Battle of Eora Creek–Templeton's Crossing =

- Part of the Second World War, Pacific War
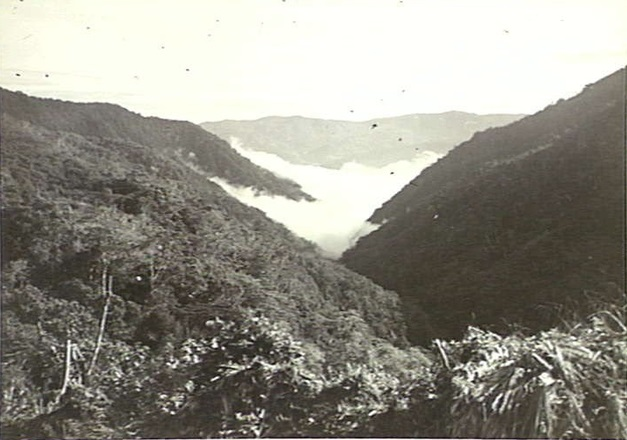
- Eora Creek valley
Date	11–28 October 1942
Location	Territory of Papua 9.0334205°S 147.7372547°E
Result	Australian advance

Belligerents
Australia	Japan

Commanders and leaders
(Australia) Arthur Allen (Australia) John Edward Lloyd (Australia) Kenneth Eather	(Empire of Japan) Tomitaro Horii (Empire of Japan) Masao Kusunose

Units involved
7th Division: 16th Brigade; 25th Brigade	South Seas Detachment: 144th Infantry Regiment

Strength
1,882–2,100	986–1,075

Casualties and losses
412 killed or wounded	244 killed or wounded

The Second Battle of Eora Creek–Templeton's Crossing was fought from 11 to 28 October 1942. Forming part of the Kokoda Track campaign of the Second World War, the battle involved military forces from Australia, supported by the United States, fighting against Japanese troops from Major General Tomitaro Horii's South Seas Detachment who had landed in Papua in mid-1942, with the intent of capturing Port Moresby.

It formed part of the Australian pursuit of the Japanese towards the beachheads around Buna and Gona, following the abandonment of plans to capture Port Moresby. The Australians took heavy casualties as part of efforts to advance north to re-take Kokoda and then push on towards Oivi and Gorari in November. Eora Creek village and Templeton's Crossing had also been the site of a battle from August to September 1942, as the Australian forces were forced to retire toward Port Moresby by the advancing Japanese.

== Background ==
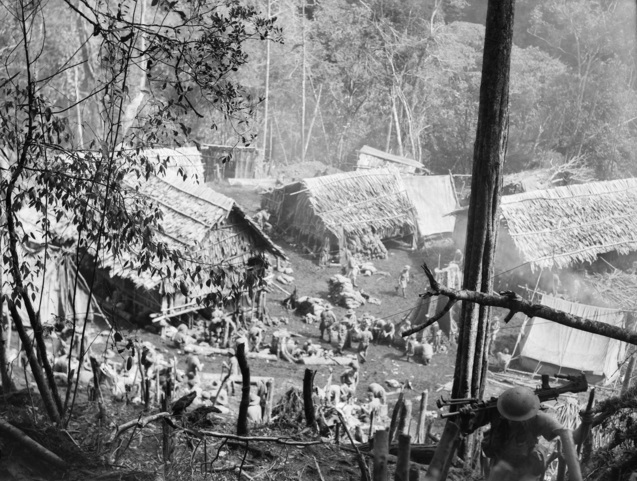
Eora Village, 27 August 1942, just before the battle

On 21 July 1942, Japanese forces landed on the northern Papuan coast around Buna and Gona. The landing was part of a plan to capture the strategically important town of Port Moresby via an overland advance along the Kokoda Track following the failure of a seaborne attempt at the Battle of the Coral Sea in May. While more forces were gradually committed to face the advancing Japanese, the South Seas Detachment, under command of Major General Tomitaro Horii advanced steadily south towards their objective on the southern coast.

During a series of battles along the track in August and September, the Japanese force fought the Australians back to Ioribaiwa, near the southern end of the Kokoda Track. Here, in mid-September, the Australians finally managed to fight the Japanese to a standstill before withdrawing further to Imita Ridge, where they established a final defensive line for a last stand. Before this climactic battle could take place, though, the Japanese reached the limit of their supply line and the strategic situation elsewhere in the Pacific – specifically the defeats around Milne Bay and on Guadalcanal – resulted in the tide shifting towards the Australians. By late September, the Japanese commander, Horii, received orders to assume a defensive posture rather than continuing the drive on Port Moresby.

Horii had been ordered to withdraw – initially, to the Isurava–Kokoda area to secure these as "a base for future operations". (Note: In an order of 23 September, by the 17th Army.) On 24 September, the 2nd/144th Battalion withdrew from Ioribaiwa. The 3rd/144th Battalion formed the rearguard and withdrew during the night of 26 September. An ad hoc force known as the "Stanley Detachment", consisting mainly of the 2nd/144th, was subsequently tasked with establishing a stronghold in the Owen Stanley Ranges, while the rest of Horii's force fell back further north to await for more favourable conditions to develop to allow a renewed assault on Port Moresby.

Brigadier Kenneth Eather, commanding the Australian 25th Brigade, ordered patrols toward Ioribaiwa, both to harass the Japanese and to gather intelligence on their disposition. By 27 September, he issued orders to his battalion commanders for an "all-out" assault the following day. The attack found that Ioribaiwa had been abandoned and the artillery fired by the Australians had been without effect. Patrols followed up immediately, with one of the 2/25th Battalion finding that by 30 September, Nauro was unoccupied.

== Battle ==
=== Advance to contact ===
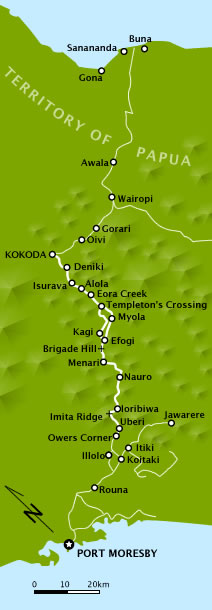
The Kokoda Track

The 25th Brigade, to which the 3rd Battalion was attached, commenced its advance to pursue the Japanese. The 3rd and 2/25th Battalions assumed the lead, and they subsequently found Menari devoid of Japanese troops and then continued on to Brigade Hill, where they were confronted by evidence of the battle that had taken place there in early September. Meanwhile, commencing 3 October, the 16th Brigade, which had landed in Port Moresby a fortnight earlier, followed to occupy the positions on Imita Ridge. With the 16th Brigade committed to the advance, direct command passed to the 7th Division, under Major General Arthur "Tubby" Allen. (Note: On 9 September 1942, Allen's command responsibilities were narrowed to the direct prosecution of the Kokoda Track campaign and flank protection. See New Guinea Force Operation Instruction No. 26 of 9 September 1942.)

Allen was conscious of the supply difficulties he would encounter and moderated his advance accordingly but was pressured by General Sir Thomas Blamey, commander of Allied Land Forces, and General Douglas MacArthur, Supreme Commander of Allied Forces in the Southwest Pacific Area, to pursue what they perceived to be a fleeing enemy. In fact though, Horii's force had made a clean break and withdrawn back to a series of four defensive positions prepared in advance. These were the responsibility of the Stanley Detachment, which was based on the 2/144th Battalion. The first two positions were forward near the northern ends of the two tracks north from Kagi – the main Myola track and the original track, also known as the Mount Bellamy Track. The third position overlooked Templeton's Crossing, where the two tracks rejoined. The fourth position was at Eora Village.

The Australians eventually located the Japanese on 8 October, when a patrol from the 2/25th clashed with some Japanese around Myola Ridge. On 10 October, Myola was reoccupied by the Australians. By 12 October, the 2/33rd Battalion was advancing toward Templeton's Crossing on the Myola Track and the 2/25th Battalion on the Mount Bellamy Track. The 3rd Battalion was at Myola while the 2/31st Battalion was advancing on Kagi, near the southern junction of the two tracks. The 16th Brigade was advancing on Menari to take up a position at Myola with the intention of taking the vanguard as the brigade moved through Templeton's Crossing.

A series of actions were subsequently fought around the Eora Creek and Templeton's Crossing areas between 11 and 28 October. Initially, the Australians outnumbered the Japanese roughly 2 to 1, with 1,882 Australians pitted against 986, essentially mirroring the situation during the first battle in this vicinity.

=== Myola Ridge and Mount Bellamy Track ===
The Stanley Detachment had deployed its main force (520) on the Myola track and a lesser force (147) on the Mount Bellamy Track. On the Myola track, the Japanese occupied four positions in-line along the track with a total depth of 1,300 metres (1,400 yd). (Note: From map in Anderson 2014, p. 135.) While occupying only a narrow front, these positions were well developed and mutually supporting, with alternative gun positions that confounded attacks by the Australians. A forward patrol of the 2/33rd Battalion contacted the most lightly held forward position on 10 October. The remainder of C Company joined the fight the next day as Lieutenant Colonel Alfred Buttrose, the commanding officer, bought up the remainder of the 2/33rd Battalion on 12 October. After resisting a series of frontal and flanking manoeuvres, the 3rd Battalion, having moved into position by an enveloping move to the western flank, was to co-ordinate with the 2/33rd Battalion in an attack on 15 October. However, the attack found that the Japanese had already withdrawn.

On the Mount Bellamy Track, the 2/25th Battalion met with the lesser Japanese force on 13 October and, after reporting the Japanese positions clear on 15 October, patrolled to Templeton's Crossing the following day. Nonetheless, Lieutenant Colonel Richard Marson, commanding officer of the 2/25th Battalion has been criticised by Williams for not progressing the advance toward Templeton's Crossing more quickly – in the face of a force inferior to that opposing the 2/33rd Battalion. These two engagements have subsequently been identified as the opening phase of the Second Battle of Templeton's Crossing–Eora Creek.

=== Templeton's Crossing ===
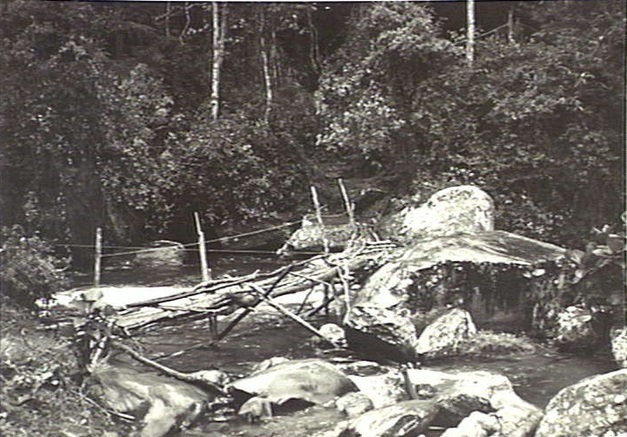
Templeton's Crossing in 1944

The battalions of the 25th Brigade (less the 2/31st Battalion) reached the northern confluence of the tracks at Templeton's Crossing on 16 October. Japanese artillery engaged the lead elements of Maroubra Force to slow their advance. As D Company of the 3rd Battalion advanced, the Japanese position was identified in the late afternoon. It straddled the track on the high ground to the east of Eora Creek and 450 metres (500 yd) north of the crossing. The Stanley detachment had occupied two parallel spurs running toward the creek from the main ridgeline. Lieutenant Colonel Allan Cameron, now commanding the 3rd Battalion, concentrated his force for an attack on the morrow, while the other two battalions deployed to his rear; two back, with the 2/25th Battalion on the western side of the creek. Attacks on 17 and 18 October were directed from the high ground on the Japanese eastern flank by the 3rd Battalion and A and D Companies of the 2/25th Battalion but failed to achieve a decisive outcome.

During the morning of 19 October, the 2/2nd Battalion under Lieutenant Colonel Cedric Edgar pushed forward to assist the 3rd Battalion, while the remaining two battalions of the 16th Brigade, under the command of Brigadier John Lloyd relieved the 2/25th and 2/33rd Battalions. On 20 October, the 2/2nd Battalion mounted an attack employing four companies from the high-ground to the east. This attack was to be renewed the following day, 21 October, but the Stanley Detachment had withdrawn in the night. Horii's main force had been withdrawn to Kokoda–Oivi. When the Stanley Detachment was forced to withdraw from Templeton's Crossing, he sent all available reinforcement to man the final position at Eora Village. All told, the Japanese held the village with around 1,075 men, supported by artillery. Against this, the Australian force consisted of 2,100 troops, of which 1,770 were infantrymen.

=== Eora Village ===
The Australian advance then began toward Eora Village. The 2/1st Battalion, under Lieutenant Colonel Paul Cullen led the advance along the main track, with half of the 2/3rd Battalion following. The 2/2nd Battalion was following a parallel track along the ridgeline to the east, with the remaining two companies of the 2/3rd Battalion leading. In the afternoon, both columns were halted by ambushes which withdrew in the night. On 22 October, the companies of the 2/3rd Battalion now led the western column advancing along the track. As a patrol entered Eora Village at about 10:30 am, it was fired upon.

Eora Village was on the northern end of a bald spur, rising to the south east. The spur was framed by Eora Creek on the southwest and north, and a tributary on the northeast. From the village, the track first crossed the tributary and then Eora Creek by log bridges. It then followed along the western side of the Creek as it headed northward. Overlooking the village from the north was a spur-line rising to the west to join the main Eora Ridge, marking the western side of the valley. It was here that the Japanese had prepared two defensive positions – one on the lower slopes of the spur and another much higher up. Anderson reports that the Japanese had spent nearly two months in fortifying the position. From these, they could bring fire from medium machine guns and five artillery pieces. (Note: Of note, battle maps provided by McCarthy indicate heavy mortars and a mountain gun.)

On the afternoon of 22 October, against representations from his battalion commanders, (Note: They favoured an attack from the west, down onto the position, as had been used to break the position at Templeton's Crossing.) Lloyd ordered a frontal attack on the Japanese [lower] position. This commenced shortly after. Anderson describes what followed as being highly confused but, dawn of 24 October found the attacking force of battalion strength largely pinned down in front of the Japanese position, having suffered 34 killed and many more injured, with no prospect of success. Lloyd then ordered the 2/3rd Battalion under Lieutenant Colonel John Stevenson to attack down on the Japanese positions from the top of Eora Ridge (to the west) but deploying this force to a forming-up point would take time. By this time, the arrival of reinforcements was strengthening the Japanese position.

The attack of the 2/3rd Battalion commenced in the morning of 27 October. Horii had ordered a withdrawal from the position on the night of 28 October. Since Colonel Kusonose Masao had been evacuated through illness, Lieutenant Colonel Tsukamoto Hatsuo now acted as commander of the 144th Regiment and the Stanley Detachment. In compliance with Horii's order, he had prepared by withdrawing artillery and the 1st/144th and 2nd/144th Battalions on the morning of 28 October. The position was lightly held by the 3rd/144th, about to withdraw. The 2nd/41st Battalion, was tasked as rearguard behind the position. The 2/3rd Battalion resumed its attack on 28 October, now under the command of Major Ian Hutchinson who had taken over from Stevenson who had been evacuated due to an ear injury. Co-ordinated with the remainder of the brigade, the attack resulted in a rout and the position was secured on 29 October. In the aftermath, Lloyd was criticised for making a poor tactical decision in ordering a frontal attack at the start of this battle – a decision which led to higher casualties than might otherwise have occurred and unduly delayed the Australian advance.

== Aftermath ==
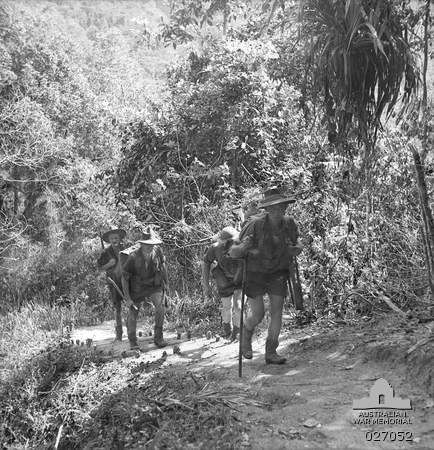
Troops from the 16th Brigade cross the Owen Stanleys, October 1942.

On 28 October, Major General George Vasey arrived at Myola to relieve Allen. The Australian advance recommenced on 29 October and was to proceed along three axes. The 2/31st Battalion was detached to the 16th Brigade which advanced along the main track and the Aola ridgeline to the east. The 25th Brigade followed a parallel track to the east of Eora Creek while the 3rd Battalion secured Myola. With a loss of positions that commanded The Gap and the approach to Port Moresby, Horii turned his attention to defending the beachheads at Buna–Gona. He concentrated his force around Oivi and Gorari. While a rearguard force screened his preparations, this was successively withdrawn without contact being made.

Aola was entered on 30 October and airdrops there alleviated supply problems as the Australian line-of-communication extended from Myola. On 2 November, a patrol of the 2/31st Battalion entered Kokoda and found that it had been abandoned. Vasey had re-gained access to the village's vital airstrip which helped relieve the pressure on the supply chain which had largely relied upon Papuan carriers. The two brigades then fought the final battle of the campaign around Oivi and Gorari between 4 and 11 November 1942. After this, the Japanese abandoned most of their artillery and completed their withdrawal across the Kumusi River, falling back to Buna and Gona, where heavy fighting followed in December 1942 and January 1943.

The fighting around Eora Creek was later described by Sunday Telegraph journalist Barclay Crawford as the "bloodiest and most significant battle of the Australian Army's campaign to retake the Kokoda Track". In the final phase of the fighting, between 22 and 29 October 72 Australians were killed and 154 wounded, while the Japanese lost 64 killed and 70 wounded. Total battle casualties throughout the period 12 to 28 October amounted to 412 Australians killed or wounded against 244 Japanese.

The second engagement around Eora Creek–Templeton's Crossing was the first victory of the Kokoda Campaign for the Australians, but as Williams argues it was only a partial victory in so much as while the Australians had secured an exit from the mountainous Owen Stanleys, the Japanese force had not been destroyed and was therefore able to withdraw further north and continue to delay the Australian pursuit. In the aftermath of the fighting, the Australian high command relieved the 7th Division commander, Allen, of his command, citing the slow progress of his troops against a Japanese force half their size.

After the war, according to Crawford, the location of the battle was kept secret by the local villagers "out of respect for the dead". In 2010, the location of the battlefield was announced by Brian Freeman, a former Australian commando and tour guide. A battle honour was awarded to Australian units after the war for involvement in the engagements: "Eora Creek–Templeton's Crossing II". The battle honour, "Eora Creek–Templeton's Crossing I" was awarded for the first battle fought in this area during the Australian withdrawal. The 39th, 2/14th and 2/16th Infantry Battalions received the first battle honour, while the 3rd, 2/1st, 2/2nd, 2/3rd, 2/25th, 2/31st and 2/33rd received the second.
