= First Battle of Eora Creek–Templeton's Crossing =

- Part of the Second World War, Pacific War
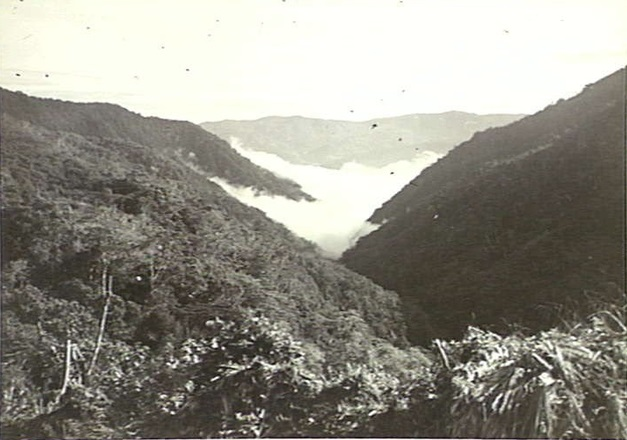
- Eora Creek valley
Date	31 August – 5 September 1942
Location	Territory of Papua 9.0334205°S 147.7372547°E
Result	Japanese advance

Belligerents
Australia	Japan

Commanders and leaders
(Australia) Sydney Rowell (Australia) Arnold Potts	(Empire of Japan) Tomitaro Horii (Empire of Japan) Kiyomi Yazawa

Units involved
Maroubra Force: 2/14th Infantry Battalion; 2/16th Infantry Battalion; 39th Infantry Battalion	South Seas Detachment: 41st Infantry Regiment

Strength
710	1,300

Casualties and losses
21 killed 54 wounded	43 killed 58 wounded

The First Battle of Eora Creek–Templeton's Crossing was fought from 31 August 1942 to 5 September 1942. Forming part of the Kokoda Track campaign of the Second World War, the battle involved military forces from Australia, supported by the United States, fighting against Japanese troops from Major General Tomitaro Horii's South Seas Detachment who had landed in Papua in mid-1942, with the intent of capturing Port Moresby. The battle was one of three defensive actions fought by the Australians along the Kokoda Track. The fighting resulted in the delay of the Japanese advance south, which allowed the Australians to withdraw to Efogi. Eora Creek village and Templeton's Crossing was subsequently the site of a battle in late October 1942 as the Australian forces pursued the Japanese forces retiring back toward the north coast of Papua.

== Background ==
On 21 July 1942, Japanese forces landed on the northern Papuan coast around Buna and Gona, as part of a plan to capture the strategically important town of Port Moresby via an overland advance along the Kokoda Track following the failure of a seaborne attempt at the Battle of the Coral Sea in May. After minor skirmishes with small groups of Australian and Papuan forces around Awala, Australian resistance along the track grew and throughout July and August a number of battles were fought along the Kokoda Track as the Japanese advanced force, Colonel Yosuke Yokoyama's 15th Independent Engineer Regiment, advanced steadily south towards their objective on the southern coast.

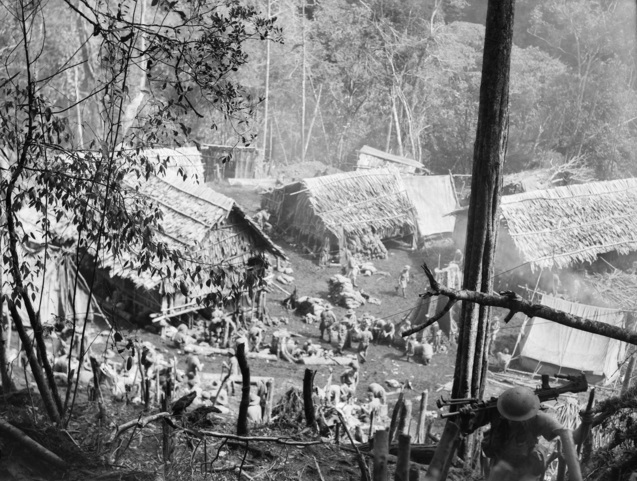
Eora Village, 27 August 1942, just before the battle

Following a confusing see-saw encounter, Kokoda fell to the Japanese in early August, This was followed by heavy fighting around Deniki. After that, the main body of Japanese troops, Major General Tomitaro Horii's South Seas Detachment, began to arrive from Rabaul. The first major battle of the campaign took place around Isurava later in the month as the veteran Australian 21st Brigade, under Brigadier Arnold Potts, reinforced the Militia troops of Maroubra Force who had been holding the line to that point. At the end of the month, in an effort to slow the Japanese advance, the Australians had established a blocking force around Eora Creek, to the south of the village of Eora, on the high ground overlooking Templeton's Crossing. Following their efforts around Isurava, the Japanese 144th Infantry Regiment was rested, and the 41st Infantry Regiment was assigned the task of following up the Australians as they withdrew south and attempt to destroy them.

== Battle ==
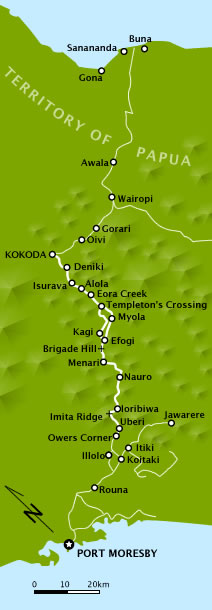
The Kokoda Track

Coming in the aftermath of the fighting around Isurava, the engagement around Eora was fought between 31 August and 5 September as Maroubra Force fought to disengage from the Japanese pursuit. The heavily depleted Australian 2/14th, 2/16th and 39th Infantry Battalions (Note: The 39th Infantry Battalion remained forward until it was withdrawn on 5 September. As it covered the initial withdrawal from Isurava in a position just south of Alola, it was reformed into two composite companies numbering less than 150 in total. On the morning of 31 October, the 53rd Infantry Battalion was sent out of battle and ordered to return to Myola.) successfully delayed two battalions from Colonel Kiyomi Yazawa's 41st Infantry Regiment. This subsequently allowed the Australians to fall back further towards Efogi.

Throughout the battle, the 2/16th and 2/14th Infantry Battalions were employed as the rearguard, with the 2/14th initially in reserve. The action, for the most part, was conducted by each successively pulling back through the reserve position to a designated blocking position and then holding that until an assigned time before moving further back further. On the evening of 31 August, Horii appointed the 41st Infantry Regiment to the vanguard – replacing the 144th that had led the force toward Isurava. The battle developed in several phases – substantially defined by delaying positions occupied by the 2/16th Infantry Battalion.

The 2/16th Infantry Battalion covered the withdrawal of Maroubra Force from Isurava (and particularly, the wounded from the battle) toward Eora Village from a series of positions between Alola and Eora Village. The final of these, about halfway between the two localities, was quit at 2 am on 1 September. The rearguard from this position was closely pursued as it retired toward Eora Village. Arriving about midday 1 September, the 2/16th Infantry Battalion adopted a defensive position on a bald spur on the southern side of the creek that overlooked the crossing and village. The 2/14th Infantry Battalion was about 1 kilometre (1,100 yd) south along the track. The 39th Infantry Battalion had been holding the position at Eora Village. Once the 2/16th Infantry Battalion had withdrawn to the village, the 39th was ordered to proceed to Kagi and hold there.

The 2/16th Infantry Battalion's position was ranged by Japanese artillery, while two companies attempted a flanking move from the east. These attackers, having not been previously engaged during the campaign, were somewhat cautious in approaching the Australian position. Nonetheless, the Australians were aggressively probed through the night. The battalion held until the designated time to disengage – 6:00 am on 2 September. The battalion withdrew through the reserve, to a position on a high point of the track about 0.62 miles (1 km) north of Templeton's Crossing. The 2/14th Infantry Battalion was in contact as it retired on this position. The Japanese advance, led by the 2/41st Battalion, probed the Australian 2/16th Infantry Battalion's flanks and threatened to isolate it. A rough path, circling to the east and back to Dump 1, was found. Dump 1 is the first point, heading north, where the track crosses Eora Creek and is about 2 kilometres (1.2 mi) direct distance south of Templeton's Crossing. Potts ordered the 2/16th Infantry Battalion to hold until dusk. The 2/14th needed time to realign with a plan for a withdrawal along this alternative route and be able to cover Templeton's Crossing. As the 2/16th commenced their withdrawal, they were observed and came under attack.

The 2/14th Infantry Battalion had occupied a position on the high ground to the south of Dump 1. The 2/16th Infantry Battalion arrived there at 4:00 pm on 3 September and took over their position, with the 2/14th retiring to Myola. Almost straight after the departure of the 2/14th, the 2/16th was contacted. With its flanks threatened, it was able to withdraw upon itself and break contact toward Myola. Potts reconciled to abandon Myola, destroy all material and withdraw toward Efogi and the approaching 2/27th Infantry Battalion that had been released to join the other battalions of the 21st Brigade.

== Aftermath ==
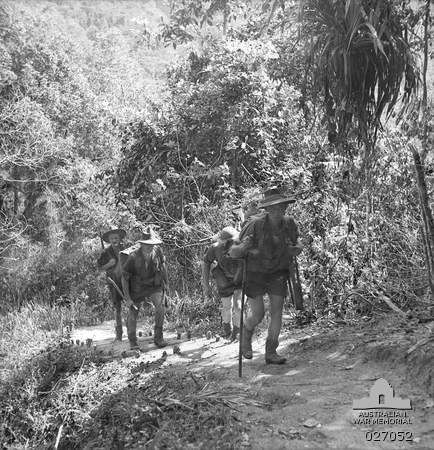
Troops from the 16th Brigade cross the Owen Stanleys, October 1942

Casualties during the engagements amounted to 43 killed and 58 wounded for the Japanese out of a force of around 1,300, and 21 killed and 54 wounded for the Australians from around 710 personnel. Author Peter Williams later described the battle as "the least-examined engagement of the campaign"; occurring so soon after the fighting around Isurava. Williams argues that the battle has been "obscured by it", highlighting that Japanese accounts in fact refer to it as the "Second Battle of Isurava", while contemporary Australian press reports were largely silent in their coverage of it. Nevertheless, it was arguably one of the main clashes during the Australian withdrawal and it was the last time during the campaign that the Japanese outnumbered the Australians. The Japanese force was supported by four artillery pieces and an engineer platoon, while Australians had only a single 3-inch mortar for indirect fire support.

Although the withdrawal resulted in the loss of their supply dump around the dry lake at Myola, the action was a successful rearguard action for the Australians, with the slowness of the Japanese pursuit contributing to this. The foodstuffs captured at Myola by the Japanese were later found to have been contaminated by the withdrawing Australians, rendering them useless. Following the fighting around Eora Creek, the Japanese 41st Regiment was criticised, particularly by members of its sister regiment, the 144th, and by Horii, for its slow rate of advance towards Efogi and its inability to destroy the Australian force, thus allowing it to regroup. The 144th subsequently took over the pursuit, catching up with them around Efogi. Along Mission Ridge and around Brigade Hill, the Australians attempted to hold the Japanese, but were defeated and forced to break track and withdraw through the scrub when the 144th Infantry Regiment managed to fix the forward Australian troops along Mission Ridge, and nearly outflank the second line of defence further back on Brigade Hill. Potts was subsequently relieved of his command, being replaced by Brigadier Selwyn Porter as commander of Maroubra Force as the Australian withdrawal south along the track continued.

Further fighting took place around Ioribaiwa where the Australians finally managed to fight the Japanese to a standstill before withdrawing further to Imita Ridge, where they established a final defensive line for a last stand. Before this climactic battle could take place though; the Japanese reached the limit of their supply line and the strategic situation elsewhere in the Pacific – specifically the defeats around Milne Bay and on Guadalcanal – resulted in the tide shifting towards the Australians, as the Japanese commander, Horii, received orders to assume a defensive posture rather than continuing the drive on Port Moresby. After the Japanese withdrew from Ioribaiwa in late September, troops from the Australian 25th Brigade, under Brigadier Kenneth Eather, later reinforced by Brigader John Lloyd's 16th Brigade, both under Major General Arthur Allen, commander of the Australian 7th Division, began advancing north from Imita Ridge along the Kokoda Track.

On 28 September, the Australians retook the abandoned trenches on Ioribaiwa and for the next two weeks, the Japanese were able to avoid contact as they fell back towards northwards towards a new defensive line. Amidst pressure from the upper echelons of the Allied high command to increase the pace of their advance northwards in pursuit of the withdrawing Japanese, in mid-October, the Australians reached Eora Creek and Templeton's Crossing, which was held by the "Stanley Detachment" of the 144th Infantry Regiment. A second battle was subsequently fought there between 11 and 28 October.

After the war, according to Crawford, the location of the battle was kept secret by the local villagers "out of respect for the dead". In 2010, the location of the battlefield was announced by Brian Freeman, a former Australian commando and tour guide. A battle honour was awarded to Australian units after the war for involvement in the engagement: "Eora Creek–Templeton's Crossing I". The battle honour, "Eora Creek–Templeton's Crossing II" was awarded for the second battle fought in this area during the Japanese withdrawal. The 39th, 2/14th and 2/16th Infantry Battalions received the first battle honour, while the 3rd, 2/1st, 2/2nd, 2/3rd, 2/25th, 2/31st and 2/33rd received the second.
