= Kensaku Oda =

- 小田 健作
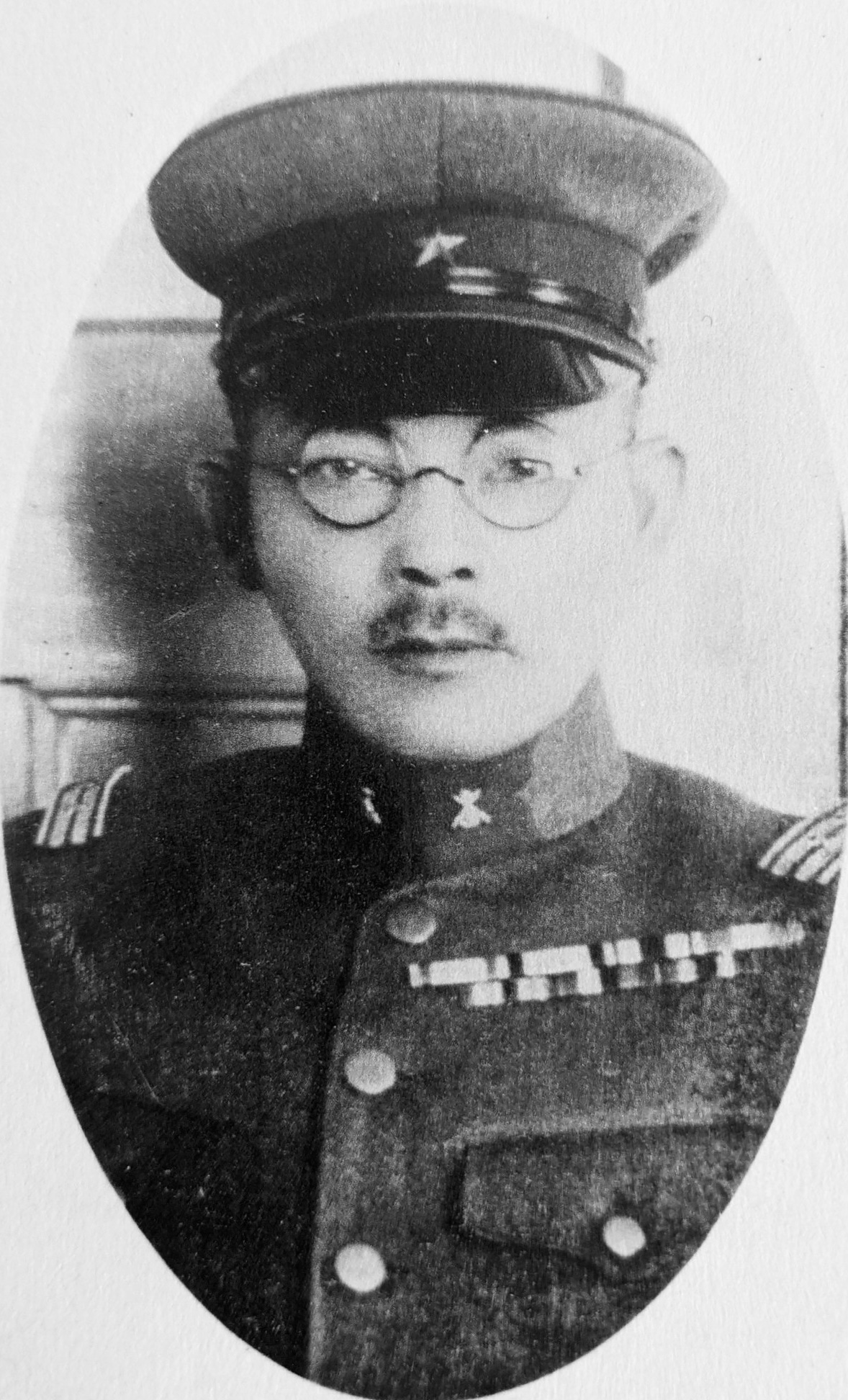
- Born: April 4, 1888; Fukuoka Prefecture, Japan
- Died: January 21, 1943 (aged 54); Kumusi River, Territory of New Guinea
- Military career
- Allegiance: Empire of Japan
- Branch: Imperial Japanese Army
- Rank: Lieutenant General (posthumous)
- Units: IJA 26th Division; Mongolia Garrison Army
- Commands: IJA 50th Infantry Regiment; IJA 26th Infantry Group; Toyohashi Reserve Officers' Cadet School; South Seas Detachment
- Conflicts: Second Sino-Japanese War; Battle of Xuzhou; World War II; New Guinea campaign

Kensaku Oda (小田 健作, Oda Kensaku; April 4, 1888 – January 21, 1943) was a general in the Imperial Japanese Army during World War II.

== Biography ==
Oda was a native of Fukuoka Prefecture. From 1938, he was the commanding officer of the IJA 50th Infantry Regiment, which was in combat during the Battle of Xuzhou in the Second Sino-Japanese War. The regiment was withdrawn back to Japan in December 1939. In August 1940, he was promoted major general and became the commanding officer of the infantry group of the IJA 26th Division, which at the time was under the command of the Mongolia Garrison Army.

In September 1941, he became the Commandant of Toyohashi Reserve Officers' Cadet School. However, due to the death of Major General Tomitarō Horii the Kokoda Track campaign in New Guinea, Oda was assigned as his replacement as Commander of the South Seas Detachment. However, the South Seas Detachment found itself flanked by Allied forces and in a location where neither reinforcements or supplies could reach. When ordered to withdraw by IJA 18th Army headquarters, Oda left behind the sick and wounded and led his men to the banks of the Kumusi River, only to find out that all of the remaining boats he had planned on for his retreat had been taken by troops which had preceded him. He committed suicide on the river bank by shooting himself with his pistol.

He was posthumously promoted to lieutenant general.
