= Battle of Eora Creek – Templeton's Crossing =

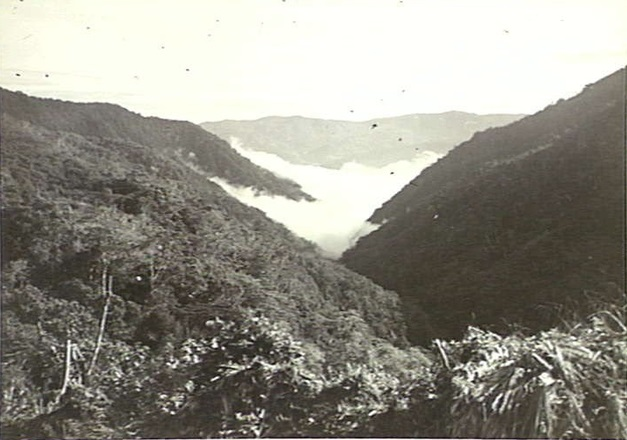
Eora Creek in 1944 (AWM image

Battle of Eora Creek – Templeton's Crossing may refer to:

- First Battle of Eora Creek – Templeton's Crossing: fought from 31 August 1942 to 5 September 1942
- Second Battle of Eora Creek – Templeton's Crossing: fought from 11 to 28 October 1942
