= Eora (disambiguation) =

Eora is a name given to a group of Aboriginal Australian people by the early settlers of what is now New South Wales.

Eora may also refer to:

- Eora Centre for the Visual and Performing Arts, Sydney, now part of TAFE NSW, formerly often referred to as simply Eora
- Eora Creek, Papua New Guinea
- Eora language, former name for the Dharug language
- Eora or aeora, ancient Greek Swing (seat)
- Eora or aeora, a festival at ancient Athens accompanied with sacrifices and banquets in commemoration of Erigone
