= Fred Pearce (footballer) =

Australian rules footballer, born 1916

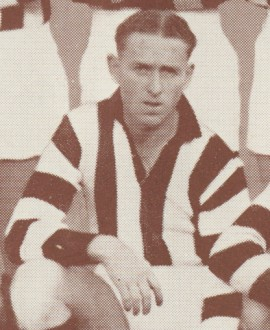
- Pearce in 1938

Personal information
- Full name: Frederick Herbert Pearce
- Born: 4 September 1916; Collingwood, Victoria
- Died: 8 May 1964 (aged 47); Abbotsford, Victoria
- Original team: North Fitzroy
- Height: 175 cm (5 ft 9 in)
- Weight: 75 kg (165 lb)

Playing career^{1}
Years	Club	Games (Goals)
1938	Collingwood	4 (1)
- ^{1} Playing statistics correct to the end of 1938.

Frederick Herbert Pearce (4 September 1916 – 8 May 1964) was an Australian rules footballer who played with Collingwood in the Victorian Football League (VFL).

== Family ==
The son of Edmund John Pearce (1878–1946), and Lillian Pearce (1882–1947), née Andrews, Frederick Herbert Pearce was born at Collingwood, Victoria on 4 September 1916.

He married Joyce Lorraine Miller (D.O.B. 4th June 1919), in 1940.

== Military service ==
Pearce served in the Australian Army during World War II, and saw active service in New Guinea where his battalion was involved in the fight against the Japanese at Isurava on the Kokoda Tack in 1942. He suffered from both dengue fever and malaria while serving.

== Death ==
He died at Abbotsford, Victoria on 8 May 1964.
