= Wairopi =

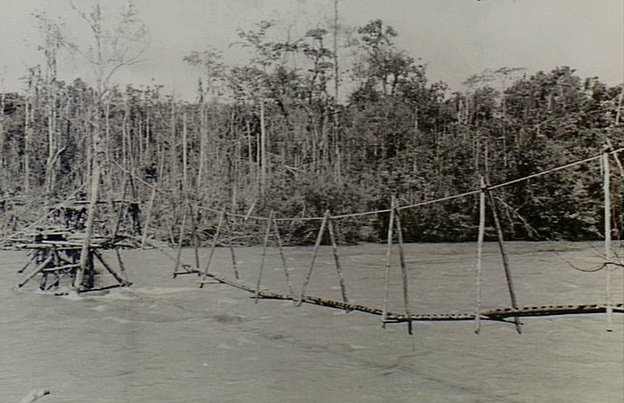
A makeshift bridge over the swift-flowing Kumusi River at Wairopi on the northern section of the Kokoda Track

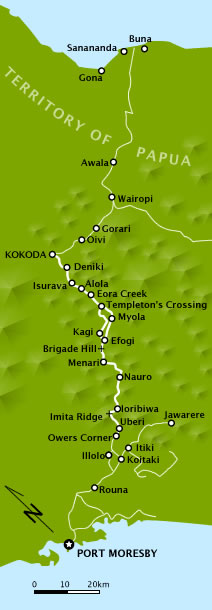
Map of the Kokoda Trail (1942) with Wairopi. The map is rotated to have NE bearings at the top of the page.

Wairopi (English: Wire Rope Bridge) is a village along the Kumusi River, in Oro Province, Papua New Guinea. The village lies along the Kokoda Track.

== History ==
During the retreat of the ill-fated Imperial Japanese campaign along the Kokoda Track during the Second World War, Japanese Major General Tomitarō Horii drowned while attempting to cross the Kumusi River at Wairopi, after the battle of Oivi-Gorari.
