= Gordon L. Rottman =

American author (1947–2026)

Gordon L. Rottman (February 24, 1947 – January 20, 2026) was an American author of mainly non-fiction, military history books.

== Life and career ==
Rottman joined the United States Army Special Forces in 1967 as a non-commissioned officer. He was initially trained as a weapons specialist and took part in the Vietnam War with the 5th Special Forces Group from 1969 to 1970. In 1974, he transferred to the Texas Army National Guard where he served as an operations sergeant. In 1986 he became a part-time reservist in the United States Army Reserve, where he developed training scenarios. He later continued this activity as a freelancer for the Joint Readiness Training Center at Fort Polk.

He wrote military history books from 1984, initially as a part-time job, mainly for Osprey Publishing. Rottman resided in Texas. He wrote over 130 books and novels.

Rottman died on January 20, 2026, at the age of 78.
