= Eora Creek =

Eora Creek is a creek in the Central Province of Papua New Guinea. The creek starts at central ridge of the Owen Stanley Mountains and runs northwards and joins the Mambare River east of Kokoda.

The creek was the site of a significant battle during World War II, part of the Kokoda Track Campaign fought from 31 August to 29 October 1942 between Japanese and Australian forces. The intact battleground was rediscovered in 2010 by former Australian Army Capt. Brian Freeman.
