= Kenneth Eather =

Australian general (1901–1993)

Kenneth William Eather
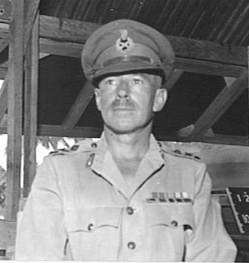
- Major General K. W. Eather
- Born: 6 July 1901; Sydney, New South Wales, Australia
- Died: 9 May 1993 (aged 91); Mosman, New South Wales, Australia
- Military career
- Allegiance: Australia
- Branch: Australian Army
- Service years: 1923–1946
- Rank: Major General
- Nicknames: "Ken" "28 days" "February" "Phar Lap"
- Service number: NX3
- Commands: 11th Division (1945–46); 25th Infantry Brigade (1941–45); 16th Infantry Brigade (1941); 2/1st Infantry Battalion (1939–41); 3rd Infantry Battalion (1937–38); 56th Infantry Battalion (1935–37)
- Conflicts: Second World War; Operation Compass; Kokoda Track campaign; Battle of Buna-Gona; Landing at Nadzab; Finisterre Range campaign; Battle of Balikpapan; New Britain campaign
- Awards: Companion of the Order of the Bath; Commander of the Order of the British Empire; Distinguished Service Order; Efficiency Decoration; Mentioned in Despatches (2); Distinguished Service Cross (United States)
- Other work: State President, New South Wales Primary Producers Association; Director, Water Research Foundation of Australia

Major General Kenneth William Eather, CB, CBE, DSO, ED (6 July 1901 – 9 May 1993) was a senior Australian Army officer who served during the Second World War. Eather led a battalion in the Battle of Bardia, a brigade on the Kokoda Track campaign and a division in the New Britain campaign. He was the last Australian officer to be promoted to the rank of major general during the Second World War, and when he died in 1993 he was Australia's last surviving general of that war.

== Education and early life ==
Kenneth William Eather was born in Sydney, New South Wales on 6 July 1901, the eldest and only son and the first of three children of William Eather, a property manager, and his wife Isabella Theresa née Lees. William managed a plantation in Papua for a time and as a boy Ken lived in Port Moresby. Ken was educated at Abbotsholme College, a boarding school that was later attended by future prime ministers Harold Holt and William McMahon. While at school he served in the Australian Army Cadets, in which he was commissioned in 1919. He left school at the age of 14 and became a dental mechanic, establishing a successful private practice. In 1923 he married Adeline Mabel Lewis. Their marriage produced two children: a daughter, Elsie Isobel, and a son, who was also named Ken.

Eather was commissioned as a lieutenant in the 53rd Infantry Battalion on 31 May 1923. He transferred to the 56th Infantry Battalion on 1 July 1925 and was promoted to captain on 23 February 1926, major on 27 November 1928, and lieutenant colonel on 1 July 1935. He commanded the 56th Infantry Battalion from 1 July 1933 to 31 July 1937 and then the 3rd Infantry Battalion from 1 August 1937 until 1 August 1938, when he was placed on the unattached list.

== Second World War ==
Following the outbreak of the Second World War in September 1939, Eather was chosen by Brigadier Arthur Samuel Allen to command the newly raised 2/1st Infantry Battalion, part of Allen's 16th Infantry Brigade. Eather enlisted in the Second Australian Imperial Force (AIF) and received the serial number NX3. His dental mechanic's practice was sold.

The 2/1st Infantry Battalion was formed from recruits from Militia in the Sydney area and trained at Ingleburn Army Camp. In January 1940 it marched through Sydney and embarked for Palestine on the P&O ocean liner SS Orford. Training continued in Palestine, with Eather emphasising mobile warfare rather than re-hashing the tactics of trench warfare from World War I, unlike some other battalion commanders with experience in that war. Eather attended the senior officers course at Middle East Tactical School in November and December 1940. He built a reputation as a disciplinarian, earning him the nicknames "28 days" and "February" (because it had 28 days) for his fondness for handing down sentences of 28 days' confinement to barracks – the harshest penalty that regulations allowed.

=== Libya ===
In December 1940, the 2/1st Infantry Battalion was chosen to spearhead the attack on Bardia. Eather led from the front. For his part in the battle he was awarded the Distinguished Service Order. His citation read:

For conspicuous gallantry and devotion to duty during the attack on BARDIA during the period from 2 Jan 41 to 5 Jan 41. He gallantly and successfully led his battalion in a night attack on 2/3 Jan 41 captured all objectives and several thousands of prisoners. On 4 Jan 41 he continued to lead his battalion with great daring and exploited the success of the first day and again captured several thousands of prisoners. On morning of 5 Jan 41 he again led his Bn. and completed the capture of the sector allotted to his battalion in the NORTHERN sector of the BARDIA perimeter. During the whole period of the attack, Lieutenant Colonel Eather set a fine example of initiative which was an inspiration to his battalion, and his general bearing throughout brought forth the admiration of his men. His careful planning of the initial attack was a masterpiece that can well be followed by others, and contributed largely to the success of the whole battle. During the initial attack the Officer in charge of Bangalore torpedoes was wounded and it looked as if things might go wrong. Lieutenant Colonel Eather was on the spot and his coolness, and advice restored confidence in the sergeant in charge of the party. At mid-day 4 Jan 41 when the advance, in part of his sector appeared to have been held up, he moved forward to ascertain the reason. After a quick appreciation he picked up a rifle and with a light machine gun detachment, moved forward to a suitable position, which he held thus restoring the confidence of his men, and brought the company forward.

Eather went on to lead the 2/1st in the capture of Tobruk. Afterwards, however, he was hospitalised with pneumonia. He therefore missed the Battle of Greece, in which the 2/1st was nearly destroyed, with over 500 of its diggers taken prisoners. On resuming command, Eather was left to rebuild his battalion. From 18 June to 13 August 1941, Eather was acting commander of the 16th Infantry Brigade. On 27 December, he became commander of the 25th Infantry Brigade. This was part of the 7th Division, which was now commanded by Allen. On 8 February 1942, the 25th Infantry Brigade boarded the transport USS Mount Vernon, initially bound for Java. It was diverted to Australia after Java was captured by the Japanese. In "recognition of gallant and distinguished services in the Middle East", Eather was mentioned in despatches.

=== Papua New Guinea – Kokoda Trail, Buna, Gona ===
The 25th Infantry Brigade arrived in Adelaide on 10 March 1942. It was soon moving north east, first to Casino, New South Wales and then to Caboolture, Queensland. In August, it was ordered to Milne Bay. En route in the Australian Army transport Katoomba, it was diverted to Port Moresby to help stem the Japanese advance on that important Allied base over the Kokoda Trail.

Eather's forces met the Japanese in the Battle of Ioribaiwa. Eather, in his first experience of jungle warfare, made a successful tactical retreat, the mode of fighting used by all Australian battalions throughout the whole of the first phase of the Kokoda Trail campaign (up until Eather's stalling of the Japanese column in sight of Port Moresby). By this tactic of withdrawing through the lines of other Australian units in defensive positions, to set up new defensive positions, the Australians of the raw militia battalions together with the hardened AIF battalions returned from the Middle East were able to avoid pincer assaults by the Japanese, who were in superior strength, while stretching Japanese supply lines to unsustainable lengths. His forces moved back to Imita Ridge, a naturally strong position, from which they held the Japanese to their southernmost land-based advance of the war, supported by battery of 25 pounders, which had been brought up the Track. While Imita Ridge had the disadvantage that it was the last defensive position on the Kokoda Trail before Port Moresby, the Japanese did not attack. Beset by logistical and health difficulties and hard pressed on Guadalcanal, they were forced to end their advance on the Kokoda Trail.

Approving Eather's withdrawal, Allen told him that there could be no further withdrawal from Imita: "You'll die where you stand." "Don't worry Tubby", Eather replied, "the only people who will die will be the Japs."

Thus began the long, hard reversal of pushing the Japanese back to the north coast from whence they had first come. Eather's force now began to push the Japanese back over the mountains, but slowly through the thick, slimy jungles. On 27 October, General Sir Thomas Blamey relieved Allen, replacing him with Major General George Alan Vasey, an officer that Eather distrusted, holding him responsible for the destruction of the 2/1st on Crete.

In November, the 25th Infantry Brigade engaged the Japanese in the Battle of Oivi-Gorari. This time the outcome was very different from Ioribaiwa, and Eather won an important advance at low cost.

Eather pressed on the coast, where the 25th Infantry Brigade encountered well-prepared Japanese positions in the Battle of Buna-Gona. Eather's men suffered heavy casualties from the enemy and tropical diseases, the 25th Infantry Brigade being almost wiped out. Eather's leadership at Gona was not as energetic as usual, perhaps because, like most of his men, he was malnourished and ill with malaria. Eather would have a series of relapses of the disease.

Eather was awarded the United States Distinguished Service Cross "for extraordinary heroism in action in New Guinea, during the Papuan campaign, 23 July 1942, to 8 January 1943. As Commander 25th Infantry Brigade, Australian Army, Brigadier Eather displayed extraordinary courage, marked efficiency and precise execution of operations during the Papuan campaign".

He was also appointed a Commander of the Order of the British Empire. His citation read:

For gallant leadership, outstanding devotion to duty, sustained untiring effort and conspicuous skill and ability in the OWEN STANLEY RANGE, NEW GUINEA, CAMPAIGN during the period from 12 Sep 42 to 29 Oct 42. Brigadier EATHER led his Brigade in the successful attack on IORIBAIWA Ridge and the subsequent advance to ALOLA. During this advance his brigade was successful in several attacks on the enemy's strongly defended positions in the TEMPLETONS CROSSING area. Throughout this arduous campaign Brigadier EATHER set an example of tenacity and endurance which was an inspiration to all who came within his influence and he efficiently demonstrated that he was at all times in complete control of the situation which confronted him, proving himself a commander who at all times was able to display sound judgement, coolness and mental clarity which were conducive to excellent planning and quick decisions.

=== Papua New Guinea – Lae ===
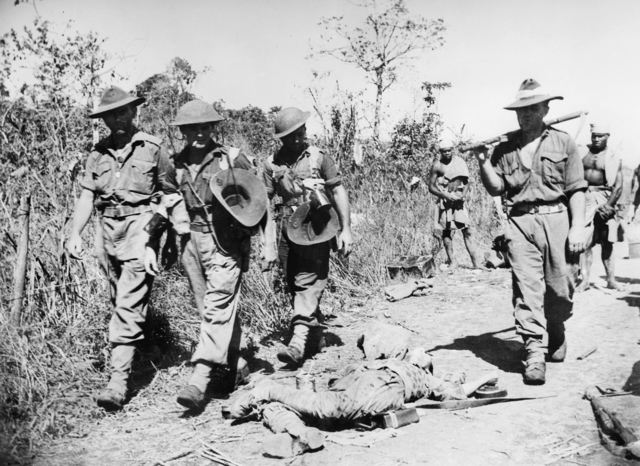
Australian troops file past a dead Japanese soldier on their way in to Lae.

After a period of rest on the Atherton Tableland, the 25th Infantry Brigade returned to Port Moresby in July 1943. Following the landing at Nadzab by American paratroops, the brigade began to fly in to Nadzab. Due to the unpredictable weather, aircraft arrived at Nadzab sporadically and only the 2/25th Infantry Battalion and part of the 2/33rd had reached Nadzab by the morning of 8 September when Vasey ordered Eather to initiate the advance on Lae. As the diggers moved down the Markham Valley Road they occasionally encountered sick Japanese soldiers who held the column momentarily. Eather came up in his jeep and started urging them to hurry up. They were unimpressed. Eather, armed with a pistol, then acted as leading scout, with his troops following in a column of route behind him. The column entered Lae unopposed by the Japanese only to be strafed by the United States Fifth Air Force and shelled by Australian artillery. For his emphasis on speed, his troops nicknamed him "Phar Lap", after the famous race horse. For his part in the campaign in New Guinea, Eather was mentioned in despatches a second time.

After Lae was liberated from Japanese occupation, 7th Division's Brigadier Eather set off by jeep to replace the Japanese flag on Mount Lunaman Voco Pointwith the Australian flag.

=== Borneo ===
In his next campaign in Borneo, however, Eather dispensed with speed in favour of a systemic advance making maximum use of firepower. He was appointed a Companion of the Order of the Bath. His citation read:

BRIGADIER K. W. EATHER commanded 25th Australian Infantry Brigade at the assault on BALIKPAPAN. Landing on 2 July he became responsible for the sector including the BALIKPAPAN-SMARINDA Road, to become the main axis of enemy strength. The enemy quickly recovered from his confusion caused by the preliminary bombardment and assault and formed strong rearguards supported by artillery and determined to fight to the death to resist our further advance in this area. Brigadier EATHER with his brigade trained and fit to a very high degree relentlessly forced the enemy back, inflicting heavy casualties, and permitting little time for the enemy to readjust his forces. Brigadier EATHER by his capacity to command, by his drive and by the skill with which he manoeuvred his brigades contributed in no small measure to the final defeat of the enemy at BALIKPAPAN.

=== New Britain ===
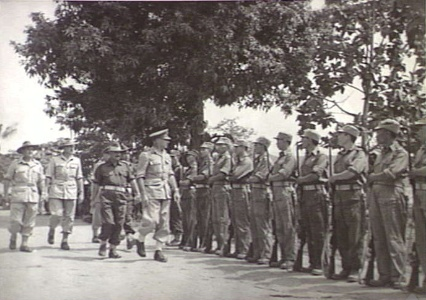
Major General Eather in Rabaul celebrating the 34th anniversary of the founding of the Republic of China with Chinese troops on 10 October 1945

In July 1945, Blamey appointed Eather to command the 11th Division, with the rank of major general. The 11th Division was then engaged with the Japanese on New Britain. He was only in command for a few weeks however before Japan surrendered. Eather then became responsible for over 100,000 Japanese prisoners in the Rabaul area. He oversaw war crimes trials and their repatriation to Japan.

=== Victory March ===
In 1946, the British government decided to hold a victory parade through London, in which some 21 nations participated. Eather was chosen to head the Australian contingent of 250 servicemen and women, drawn from the three services. The Victory March Contingent sailed for the United Kingdom on HMAS Shropshire on 8 April 1946 and marched through the city on 8 June 1946. On the return voyage sailors from the Shropshire and the troops of the Victory March Contingent started a riot in Gibraltar. Eather refused to lay any charges or offer an apology to the indignant British authorities.

== Later life ==
Eather retired from the Army on 18 September 1946 and became a poultry farmer in Penrith, New South Wales. He became active in the Primary Producer's Association of New South Wales and was elected its president in 1953, a position he held for the next five years. However, the death of his son Ken in a motorcycle accident led him to reconsider life as a farmer. In 1958, he became the head of the Water Research Foundation of Australia, and organisation that dispensed funding to researchers investigating water related issues.

Eather's wife Adeline died in 1966. In 1968 he married Kathleen Carroll. He treated Kathleen's son, Captain Owen Eather, an army officer and Vietnam War veteran, as his own son. Eather became concerned at the way Vietnam veterans were being treated by some veterans of the Second World War, and made a point of appearing at Anzac Day marches and RSL events with Owen. Eather continued to lead Anzac Day marches through Sydney until 1992. In his old age, Eather spent time with his grandson Eamon, who later joined the Australian Army Reserve and served with the International Force for East Timor.

Eather died at a nursing home in Mosman on 9 May 1993. As the last surviving Australian general of the Second World War, he was given a military funeral at St. Andrew's Cathedral, Sydney. Three companies of the 3rd Battalion, Royal Australian Regiment provided an honour guard and an oration was given by General Sir Francis Hassett. Some 1,000 veterans lined George Street, Sydney to pay their last respects to Eather, who was cremated at the Northern Suburbs Crematorium.

== Notes ==
Military offices
Preceded by Major General Alan Ramsay	General Officer Commanding 11th Division; 1945–1946	Formation disbanded
