= South Seas Detachment =

The South Seas Detachment (南海支隊, Nankai Shitai) of the Imperial Japanese Army was a brigade-size force formed in 1941 to be the army unit used in the Japanese seizure of the South Pacific island groups of Wake, Guam and the Gilberts. As part of the South Seas Force, it fell under Imperial Japanese Navy command and control. It was drawn from the 55th Division and was commanded by Major General Tomitarō Horii. It consisted of the following units:

- 144th Infantry Regiment with 2700 men
- 1st Battalion of the 55th Mountain Artillery Regiment with 750 men and 12 75mm mountain guns
- 3rd Squadron 55th Cavalry Regiment
- 1st Company 47th Anti-aircraft Artillery Battalion.
- Infantry Gun Company of the 144th Infantry Regiment
- plus Engineer, Communications, Transport and 3 Medical detachments.

The detachment was to be used to seize Guam but was diverted to Wake after the initial unsuccessful attempt by the navy to seize the atoll, where it suffered some casualties. It later rejoined the 55th Division for the New Guinea Campaign.

== Objectives of the South Seas Detachment ==
On May 4, 1942, troopships bearing the South Seas Detachment set sail southward from Rabaul for Port Moresby. Three days later, however, a naval engagement appeared to be brewing in the Coral Sea; whereupon the transports immediately veered back to the north, in order to avoid combat. The Battle of the Coral Sea caused no small loss to the Fourth Fleet. Plans to land the South Seas Detachment directly at Port Moresby from the sea had to be abandoned.

Imperial General Headquarters, on May 18, 1942, issued an order of battle for the Seventeenth Army, to be commanded by Lieutenant General Haruyoshi Hyakutake. An Army in name only, it was made up of several infantry regimental groups:

- South Seas Detachment
- Aoba Detachment
- 35th Infantry Brigade (without the 114th Infantry Regiment)
- 41st Infantry Regiment, etc.

The mission of the Seventeenth Army in Operation FS was the capture of strategic points on New Hebrides islands, New Caledonia, Fiji, and Samoa, (also Tuvalu, Tokelau, Tonga, others sources included at Fenix islands, (strategic U.S. Base in area) as well as the occupation of Port Moresby; all in co-operation with the Japanese Navy.

The objective of these operations was to take possession of strategic island points in order to intensify a cutoff in the contact between the United States and Australia, while squelching the Americans' and Australians' plans of counterattack from the same areas. Action was slated to begin about the beginning of July 1942, using the following forces:

- Bulk of the Seventeenth Army (built around nine infantry battalions)
- Second Fleet Air Arm built around First Air Fleet

== Tactical Planning of the South Seas Detachment, relation with Midway Battle and Axis Powers plans ==
Based upon the operational plans, Army troops were steadily making operations for combat when, on July 11, IGHQ ordered the suspension of the projected actions against New Caledonia, Fiji, and Samoa, because the Combined Fleet had failed at Midway. The reasons for the suspension of operations may be further summarized:

1. The Combined Fleet had been badly hurt in the Midway battle.
2. From the experience at Midway, it had been learned how difficult it was to attack an island.
3. The opinion was gaining ground that it would be more advantageous to step up operations in the western Indian Ocean, in conjunction with the actions of the German Army and to drive upon the Suez Canal.

With the release of the Seventeenth Army from the mission of attacking New Caledonia, Fiji, and Samoa, IGHQ assigned a new double objective:

- the capture and security of Port Moresby, in co-operation with the Navy; and the opportune seizure of strategic points in eastern New Guinea.
- Army components which were to participate in the new operations against Port Moresby included the bulk of the Seventeenth Army (about six infantry battalions, primarily); naval forces comprising the Eighth Fleet; and units built around the 25th Air Regiment. According to the plan, the main Army strength was expected to capture Port Moresby and the nearby airdromes, from the direction of Kokoda and Buna, as soon as possible.
- The Navy would undertake to defeat the American and Australian air forces, master the U.S.-Australian Fleet, and furnish direct support for the land operations. An Army unit had been reconnoitering the road across the Owen Stanley Mountains, which extend north of Port Moresby.

Without awaiting the reconnaissance reports, the Seventeenth Army Commander hastily landed the South Seas Detachment near Buna in mid-July 1942, and then rushed them toward Port Moresby.
