= 41st Infantry Regiment (Imperial Japanese Army) =

- Active: 1940
- Country: Japan
- Branch: Infantry
- Engagements: Second Sino-Japanese War, World War II

The 41st Infantry Regiment was an infantry regiment in the Imperial Japanese Army. The regiment was attached in 1940 to the 9th Brigade of the 5th Division of the 21st Army. The regiment participated during the Second Sino-Japanese War, and World War II.

== Organization ==
- 1st Battalion
- 2nd Battalion
- 3rd Battalion

== Works cited ==
- Rottman, Gordon L. (January 2005). Japanese Army in World War II: Conquest of the Pacific 1941–42. Battle Orders. Vol. 9. Osprey Publishing. ISBN 1-84176-789-1.
