= Buna, Papua New Guinea =

Buna
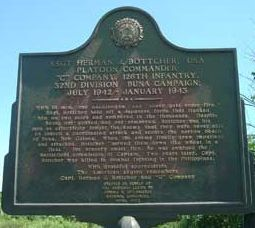
- The memorial plaque at the entrance to Buna Village, dedicated to Herman Bottcher and the 32nd Red Arrow Division Infantry Division.

- Location within Papua New Guinea
- Coordinates: 8°40′S 148°24′E
- Country: Papua New Guinea
- Province: Oro (Northern)
- Time zone: UTC+10 (AEST)

Buna is a village in Oro Province, Papua New Guinea. It was the site, in part, of the Battle of Buna–Gona during World War II, when it constituted a variety of native huts and a handful of houses with an airstrip. Buna was the trailhead to the Kokoda Track leading to Kokoda.

== History ==
Buna was the site of a handful of houses, a dozen or so native huts, and an airfield acting as a trailhead up the Kokoda Track to the foothills village of Kokoda (see Kokoda Track campaign).

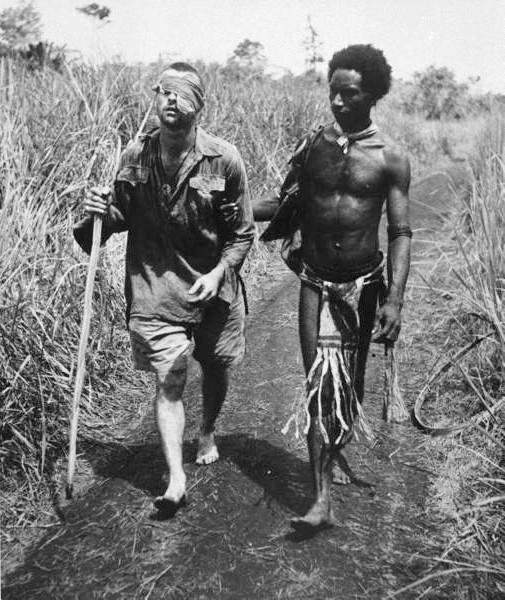
An Australian soldier is aided by a Papuan orderly near Buna in December 1942.

During World War II, Imperial Japanese troops invaded on 21–22 July 1942 and established it as a base (see Buna Airfield). Six months later, Buna was recaptured by the Australian and American armies during the Battle of Buna-Gona on 2 January 1943 during the New Guinea campaign in the South West Pacific Area. The Fifth Air Force established air bases there as the Allied counter-offensive against Japan picked up the pace and continued operations to isolate the major Japanese base at Rabaul and attack Lae and points west.

For weeks at a time General Douglas MacArthur, commander in the South Pacific, used Buna as an informal forward base. MacArthur's biographer William Manchester relates a story how Allied commanding air officer Lt. General George Kenney loved repeating of how he'd gone back to Australia for a week, and MacArthur had stolen his house, claiming it was cooler at night than his own. A week later the Monsoon winds shifted, making MacArthurs' old house now the cooler— and he never asked for Kenney to switch back.
