= Tomitarō Horii =

Japanese lieutenant general (1890–1942)

- 堀井 富太郎
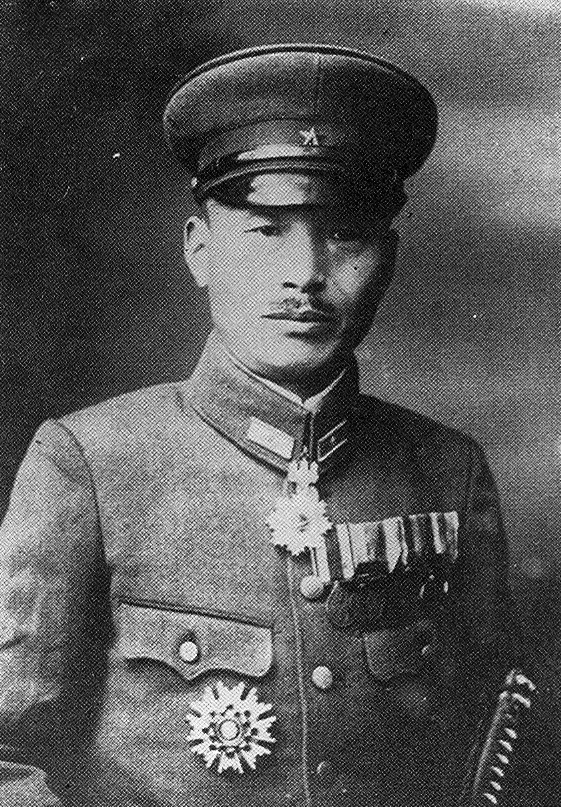
- Born: November 7, 1890; Hyōgo prefecture, Japan
- Died: November 23, 1942 (aged 52); Kumusi River, New Guinea
- Education: Imperial Japanese Army Academy; Waseda University
- Military career
- Allegiance: Empire of Japan
- Branch: Imperial Japanese Army
- Service years: 1911–1942
- Rank: Lieutenant General
- Commands: IJA 78th Infantry Regiment; 55th Infantry Division
- Conflicts: Second Sino-Japanese War World War II: Battle of Guam (1941); Kokoda Track campaign
- Other work: Governor of Guam

Tomitarō Horii (堀井 富太郎, Horii Tomitarō; November 7, 1890 – November 23, 1942) was a lieutenant general in the Imperial Japanese Army during World War II.

After graduating from the Imperial Japanese Army Academy in 1911, Horii served in China before undertaking a variety of regimental appointments. Following Japan's entry into World War II, he commanded a division during the capture of Guam before commanding the Japanese force that had been given the task of capturing Port Moresby. In November 1942, in the retreat from Oivi–Gorari, Horii drowned while attempting to canoe down the Kumusi River to reach Japanese forces defending Buna–Gona. His canoe was swept out to sea and capsized.

== Biography ==
Born in Hyōgo Prefecture, Horii became an infantry officer following his graduation from the 23rd class of the Imperial Japanese Army Academy in 1911. He was later assigned to the headquarters of the Shanghai Expeditionary Army, and in early 1932 during the prelude to the Second Sino-Japanese War, was involved in the January 28 incident.

From 1935 to 1937, Horii was attached to the IJA 12th Infantry Regiment, having previously attended Waseda University. He became commander of the IJA 78th Infantry Regiment in 1938, after his promotion to colonel the previous year. In March 1940, Horii was promoted to major general. The following year Horii was appointed commander of the Nankai-Detachment (Nankai-Shitai（南海支隊）) of the IJA 55th Division, part of the South Seas Force. Horii led this organization in the Japanese invasion and subsequent capture of Guam during December 8–10, 1941; following this engagement, Horii served briefly as the Japanese military Governor of Guam.

During the New Guinea campaign, Horii and his South Seas Force were assigned to the invasion of Port Moresby, but were turned back after the escorting naval force was attacked by Allied forces during the Battle of the Coral Sea. The Japanese then planned an overland attack to capture the town by advancing from the north coast. In July 1942, they landed to established beachheads at Buna, Gona and Sanananda. This marked the beginning of the Kokoda Track campaign. The South Seas Force, under Horii's command, advanced using the Kokoda Track to cross the rugged Owen Stanley Range.

By 16 September, after heavy fighting against a small Australian Army force, Horii's command had advanced as far as Ioribaiwa, and was close enough to see the lights of Port Moresby. In light of reverses at Guadalcanal, the Japanese command determined it could not support both battles and, on 23 September, Horii was ordered to withdraw his troops on the Kokoda Track until the issue at Guadalcanal was decided. Limited provision had been made for the resupply of Horii's force and, by this time, the situation had reached a crisis. On 26 September, the Japanese commenced to withdraw from the front line. They fought a well-ordered rear-guard action back over the Owen Stanley Range, with the Australian forces in close pursuit.

Horii's force had been severely depleted by lack of supply but at Oivi, near the northern end of the Kokoda Track, Horii's force received both resupply and reinforcement. The Japanese suffered heavily in the battle around Oivi–Gorari from 4 to 11 November, and the well-ordered withdrawal that had been planned quickly disintegrated into a rout. The Australians crossed the Kumusi River at Wairopi on 16 November and were now about 65 km (40 mi) from Buna–Gona. (Note: Anderson reports the distance as 25 mi (40 km). This is consistent with the straight-line distance indicated by maps in other sources.)

The flooded river blocked the retreat of Horii's force. Horii decided to raft down the river with a small party so he might more quickly reach the Buna–Gona positions that were being threatened by the Australian advance. Gunfire had been heard from the coast. When the raft became snagged on trees, he took to a canoe that was found by the river's edge. The canoe was swept out to sea and capsized during a storm. Horii drowned but his orderly survived to report his death. Horii was posthumously promoted to lieutenant general.

== Bibliography ==
- Anderson, Charles (1992). Papua. The U.S. Army Campaigns of World War II. Vol. 11. Washington, D.C.: United States Army Center of Military History. ISBN 978-0-16-035883-8.
- Bullard (2007). Bôeichô Bôei Kenshûjo Senshishitsu (ed.). Japanese Army Operations in the South Pacific Area New Britain and Papua Campaigns, 1942–43. Translated by Steven Bullard. Canberra: Australian War Memorial. ISBN 978-0-9751904-8-7.
- Dupuy, Trevor N. (1992). Encyclopedia of Military Biography. London: I B Tauris & Co. ISBN 1-85043-569-3. OCLC 59974268.
- Gamble, Bruce (2001). Darkest Hour: The True Story of Lark Force at Rabaul – Australia's Worst Military Disaster of World War II. St. Paul, MN: Zenith Press. ISBN 0-7603-2349-6. OCLC 71288724.
- Hayashi, Saburō (1959). Kogun: The Japanese Army in the Pacific War. Quantico, VA: Marine Corps. Association. OCLC 1133179.
- Horner, David (May 1993). "Defending Australia in 1942". War & Society. 11 (1): 1–21. doi:10.1179/072924793791198886.
- James, Karl (2009). ""The Track": A Historical Desktop Study of the Kokoda Track" (PDF). Commonwealth Department of the Environment.
- McCarthy, Dudley (1959). South – West Pacific Area – First Year: Kokoda to Wau. Australia in the War of 1939–1945, Series 1—Army. Volume V (1st ed.). Canberra: Australian War Memorial. OCLC 3134247.
- Milner, Samuel (1957). Victory in Papua. United States Army In World War II. Washington, DC: Center Of Military History, United States Army. LCCN 56-60004.
- Smith, Michael (2000). Bloody Ridge: The Battle That Saved Guadalcanal. New York: Pocket. ISBN 0-7434-6321-8.

Government offices
Preceded by Walter McNicoll as Administrator of New Guinea	Commander of Occupied New Guinea; 1942	Succeeded by Hyakutake Seikichi
