= 144th Infantry Regiment (Imperial Japanese Army) =

- Active: 1937 - 1945
- Country: Empire of Japan
- Branch: Imperial Japanese Army
- Type: Infantry
- Engagements: World War II: Second Sino-Japanese War; Guam; Rabaul

The 144th Infantry Regiment was an infantry regiment in the Imperial Japanese Army. The regiment was attached to the 55th Division. The regiment participated in the Second Sino-Japanese War and World War II, fighting in the Pacific during a number of battles including those at Guam, Rabaul, and Salamaua. It also participated in the invasion of Buna-Gona, the Kokoda Track campaign and the battle of Buna–Gona.

After being withdrawn to Rabaul, the regiment was transported to Burma to rejoin the 55th Division.

== Organization ==
- 1st Battalion
- 2nd Battalion
- 3rd Battalion

== Commanders ==
- Lieutenant Colonel Masao Kusunose (????–1942; suicided in 1946)
- Colonel Yamamoto (1942–1943; killed in action) †

== Sources ==
- Brooks, Brenton (December 2013). "The Carnival of Blood in Australian Mandated Territory". Sabretache. LIV (4). Military Historical Society of Australia: 20–31. ISSN 0048-8933.
- Rottman, Gordon L. (2004). Guam 1941 & 1944: Loss and Reconquest. Osprey Campaign series #139. Osprey Publishing. ISBN 1-84176-811-1.
