= 18th Brigade (Australia) =

Infantry brigade of the Australian Army during WWII

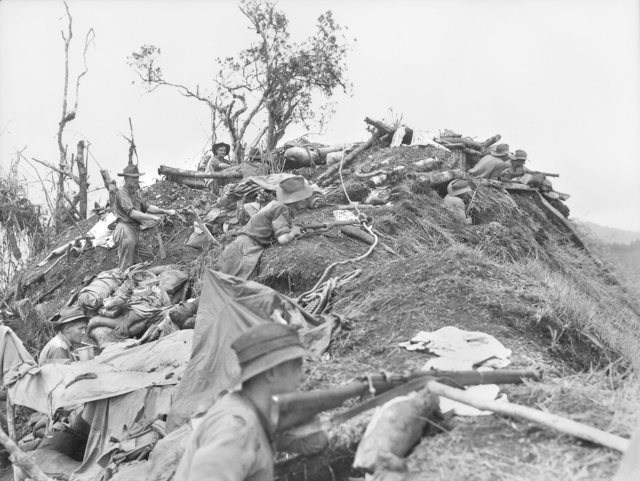
- 2/9th Battalion, part of the 18th Brigade, during the fighting at Shaggy Ridge, January 1944
- Active: 1939–1946
- Country: Australia
- Branch: Australian Army
- Type: Brigade
- Size: ~3,500 personnel
- Part of: 7th Division
- Engagements: Second World War: Siege of Tobruk; Syria–Lebanon campaign; New Guinea campaign; Borneo campaign

Commanders
- Notable commanders: Leslie Morshead

Insignia
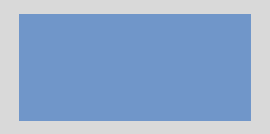
- Headquarters unit colour patch

The 18th Brigade was an infantry brigade of the Australian Army. The brigade briefly existed as a Militia formation prior to the First World War, but this was short-lived. During the Second World War, the brigade was raised on 13 October 1939 and was one of the first three infantry brigades of the Second Australian Imperial Force (2nd AIF) to be formed. Initially commanded by Brigadier Leslie Morshead, it served in the United Kingdom in 1940–1941, where it helped bolster the British garrison in anticipation of a possible German invasion following the Fall of France. In early 1941, the brigade was transferred to the Middle East where it later took part in fighting against the Italians in Libya and then helped to defend the besieged port of Tobruk before fighting against the Vichy French in the Syria–Lebanon campaign. The 18th Brigade was withdrawn to Australia in early 1942, and it later took part in the fighting against the Japanese in Pacific fighting several campaigns in New Guinea between late 1942 and early 1944. Its final involvement of the war came in mid-1945 when it took part in re-taking Balikpapan. Following the end of hostilities, the 18th Brigade was disbanded on 3 January 1946.

== History ==
=== Formation ===
The 18th Brigade briefly existed as Militia brigade that was partially formed in 1912, following the introduction of the compulsory training scheme. At this time, it was assigned to the 3rd Military District. The brigade's constituent units were spread across various locations in Victoria including Williamstown, Geelong, Ballarat, Warrnambool, Horsham and Stawell. The formation was short-lived, and was not raised as part of the First Australian Imperial Force (AIF) during the First World War. It remained on the order of battle as a Militia formation during the war, but was not re-raised in the interwar years when the Militia was reorganised to replicate the numerical designations of the AIF in 1921.

During the Second World War, the 18th Brigade was formed on 13 October 1939 as part of the 6th Division. The brigade's headquarters was opened at Victoria Barracks at Paddington, New South Wales. Upon formation the brigade consisted of the following infantry battalions: the 2/9th, the 2/10th, the 2/11th and the 2/12th Battalions, which were raised from Queensland, South Australia, Tasmania and Western Australia. Rudimentary training was conducted in home locations, before the brigade came together at Rutherford, New South Wales, in December 1939. This was followed by a further move to Ingleburn, New South Wales.

Following training, the brigade was dispatched to the Middle East, departing from Melbourne in May 1940. However, while they were at sea they were diverted to the United Kingdom in order to help defend the island against a possible invasion by German forces following the Fall of France. After landing at Gourock, Scotland, the brigade moved south to the Salisbury Plain Training Area where they undertook training and defensive duties. In the United Kingdom, the 18th Brigade provided a cadre to the newly formed 25th Brigade and became part of the 9th Division when it was raised in October 1940.

=== Middle East ===
Later, when the threat of invasion of the United Kingdom decreased, the decision was made to transfer the Australian forces there to the Middle East. The 18th Brigade arrived there in early January 1941. Around this time, the 2nd AIF was reorganised and each brigade was reduced from four battalions to three. As a result, the 2/11th Battalion was transferred to the 19th Brigade. At the same time also, the 18th Brigade was transferred to the 7th Division. Following this, on 21 March 1941, the brigade took part in an attack on an Italian stronghold at Giarabub, 230 kilometres (140 mi) south of Bardia. Although the fortress was held by about 1,500 Italians supported by artillery, the Australian force dispatched only consisted of a reinforced battalion due to supply difficulties. Setting out on 10 March from Siwa, the assault began early on the morning of 21 March from the south over marshy ground. Led by the 2/9th Battalion with machine-gun and mortar support from the 2/12th and 2/10th Battalions, the attack was put in from the south while the 6th Division Cavalry Regiment feigned an attack from the north at the strongest point of the fortress. A heavy sandstorm obscured visibility, which hindered the supporting artillery and resulted in a number of casualties when one company moved beyond the barrage. Nevertheless, heavy fighting followed and resistance continued until 2:00 pm when the Italians surrendered. About 250 Italians were killed and 1,300 captured for the loss of 17 Australians killed and 77 wounded. Following the attack, the 18th Brigade returned to Ikingi Maryut.

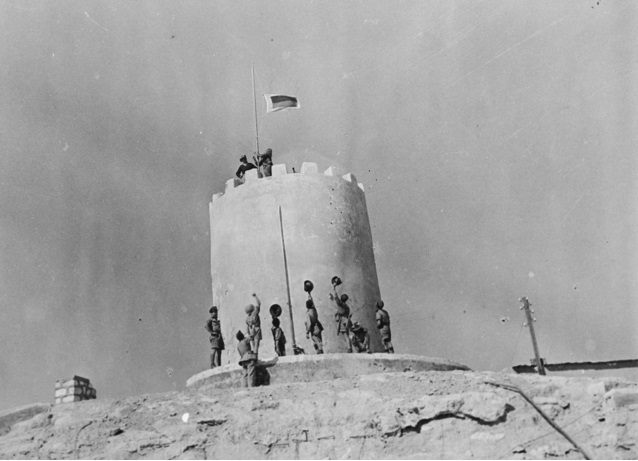
Soldiers from the 2/9th hoist a flag consisting of the battalion's unit colour patch over the recently captured Italian fort at Giarabub.

Plans were made for the 18th Brigade to deploy to Greece, but a German offensive in Libya resulted in the 7th Division being retained in North Africa. In April, the brigade was sent to Tobruk where they took part in the defence of the port between May and August 1941, alongside elements of the 9th Division. In May, the Germans managed to break into the Allied perimeter, penetrating towards an area dubbed "The Salient". The 18th Brigade subsequently led the Australian counterattack in conjunction with the 26th Brigade. Once the perimeter was restored, the brigade rotated through the various defensive sectors around the perimeter until they were relieved by a Polish brigade in August, and withdrawn to Palestine. In September 1941, the brigade rejoined the rest of the 7th Division, which had been taking part in the fighting against Vichy French forces in the Syria–Lebanon campaign. Following the armistice the division was allocated the task of undertaking garrison duties and the 18th Brigade was subsequently stationed at Aleppo, near the Turkish border to guard against a potential German attack through Turkey. Elements of the brigade were also deployed to Idlib, and patrols were mounted along the border.

=== New Guinea ===
The 18th Brigade returned to Australia in early 1942 following the outbreak of the Pacific War. Following defensive duties and training in Queensland, the 18th Brigade, under the command of Brigadier George Wootten, took part in the Battle of Milne Bay. Deployed with a battery from the 2/5th Field Regiment attached at brigade level, the 18th Brigade arrived at Milne Bay between 12 and 21 August. Between 27 August and 7 September the brigade played an important role in the fighting which resulted in the first major defeat of the Japanese on land since the war had begun in December 1941. One of the brigade's soldiers, Corporal John French, of the 2/9th Battalion, was awarded a posthumous Victoria Cross for his actions during the fighting on 4 September 1942.

Later, as the 7th Division was assigned to the advance on the Japanese bases on the Papuan coast around Buna and Gona, the brigade, although understrength, was transferred to Buna in mid-December 1942 with the 2/9th Battalion landing at Oro Bay on 15 December. On 21 January 1943, the brigade captured Sanananda alongside the US 163rd Infantry Regiment. They were finally withdrawn back to Australia on 10 March 1943. During the fighting around Buna, the 18th Brigade suffered 425 men killed and more than 800 wounded. This represented 96 per cent of the brigade's strength at the start of the campaign.

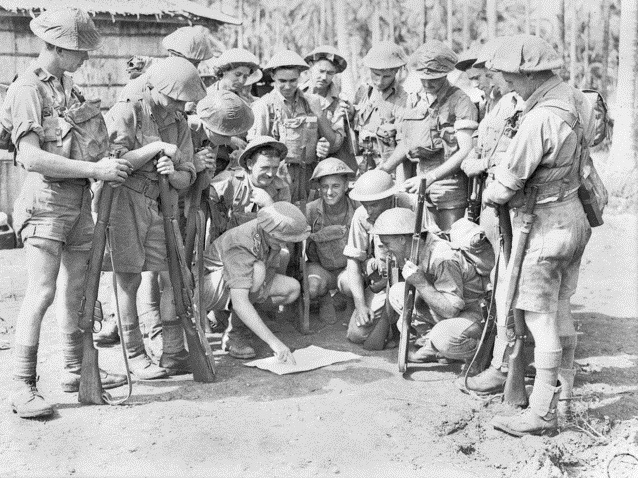
Soldiers from the 2/10th prepare for a patrol, Milne Bay, September 1942

By the time that the brigade returned to Australia, it was down to only 44 per cent of its authorised strength. In early July, the brigade was brought back up to strength with an intake of 1,300 men from the 1st Motor Brigade, which was subsequently disbanded. In August 1943, after training and re-organisation around Ravenshoe, Queensland, the 18th Brigade was deployed to Port Moresby in preparation for further operations, arriving there on 12 August. During the early phases of the Finisterre Range campaign the brigade remained in reserve around Port Moresby, while the other two brigades of the 7th Division, the 21st and 25th Brigades, were deployed to defend the approaches to Lae. They remained there until 4 January 1944 when the brigade was transported by air to Dumpu to relieve the 21st Brigade around Shaggy Ridge, subsequently taking part in the fighting around the Kankiryo Saddle, Prothero I and II and Crater Hill. Following the conclusion of the fighting around Shaggy Ridge in February, the brigade remained in New Guinea until May 1944 when they were withdrawn back to Australia for re-organisation.

=== Borneo ===
Following the brigade's return to Australia, it was reconstituted at Strathpine, Queensland, before later moving to Kairi. A long period of reorganisation and training followed, before the brigade moved to Morotai, in the Dutch East Indies, May 1945. The brigade's final involvement in the war came when they landed at Balikpapan in Borneo on 1 July 1945, as part of efforts to secure the port facilities and oilfields located there. Coming ashore in the first wave, the 18th Brigade was allocated to the landings around Klandasan, on the Allied left. Following the initial landing, the 18th Brigade, supported by 'D' Company, 2/1st Machine Gun Battalion, secured the high ground around Klandasan. On 3 July they captured the town of Balikpapan and secured its port before being relieved by the 25th Brigade. The 2/9th Battalion was detached, along with the 2/1st Pioneer Battalion, to clear the western side of the bay around Panadjam, while the rest of the brigade undertook further patrols around Balikpapan. By the end of the month, the Australians began mopping up operations, and these continued until the Japanese surrendered. Following the completion of hostilities in August, the brigade remained on Borneo as the demobilisation process began. The 18th Brigade was disbanded on 3 January 1946 at Balikpapan after its component battalions were disbanded throughout December 1945 and January 1946.

== Commanders ==
The following officers served as commanding officer of the 18th Brigade:

- Brigadier Leslie Morshead (1939–1941);
- Brigadier George Wootten (1941–1943);
- Brigadier Frederick Chilton (1943–1945).
