= 2/12th Battalion (Australia) =

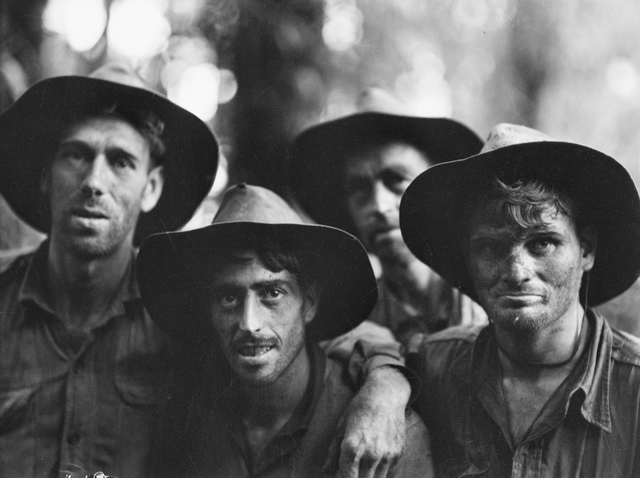
- Members of "B" Company, Australian 2/12th Battalion, who helped silence a Japanese mountain gun on one of the hills known as Prothero I & II during the Battle of Shaggy Ridge
- Active: 13 October 1939 – 1 January 1946
- Country: Australia
- Branch: Australian Army
- Type: Infantry
- Size: 800–900 men (Note: The establishment of a standard Australian infantry battalion was 35 officers and 875 other ranks at the start of World War II. Under the jungle organisation each battalion was reduced by one officer and 106 other ranks.)
- Part of: 18th Brigade, 7th Division
- Garrison/HQ: Rutherford, New South Wales
- Engagements: World War II: North African campaign; Battle of Tobruk; Syrian campaign; New Guinea campaign; Borneo campaign

Commanders
- First Commander: Lieutenant Colonel John Field

Insignia
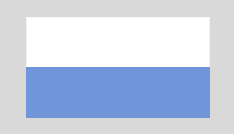
- Unit colour patch

The 2/12th Battalion was an infantry battalion of the Australian Army which served during World War II. Raised in late 1939 as part of the all volunteer Second Australian Imperial Force, the battalion's initial recruits were drawn primarily from the states of Queensland and Tasmania. Assigned to the 18th Brigade, the battalion completed basic training in Australia before embarking for overseas in May 1940.

It was originally intended that the battalion would land in the Middle East; however, the strategic situation in Europe at the time resulted in it being diverted to the United Kingdom where it formed part of Australia's contribution to the defence of the island during a period when an invasion seemed likely. When this threat passed, the 2/12th was sent to North Africa, and in 1941 it took part in the defence of Tobruk and then undertook garrison duties in Syria, before returning to Australia in early 1942. In August 1942, the battalion fought in the Battle of Milne Bay, turning back a Japanese invasion force there, before capturing Goodenough Island before returning to Australia in early 1943. The 2/12th returned to New Guinea in August 1943, and subsequently took part in the Finisterre Range campaign into early 1944. Its final campaign came in mid-1945 when it was committed to re-capturing Borneo, landing on Balikpapan in July 1945. It was disbanded in January 1946.

== History ==
=== Formation and garrison duties in the United Kingdom ===
The 2/12th Battalion was formed on 13 October 1939 as part of the Second Australian Imperial Force (2nd AIF) and was attached to the 18th Brigade, which was variously assigned throughout the course of the war to three of the four 2nd AIF divisions—the 6th, 9th and finally, the 7th. Over half of the battalion's personnel were drawn from volunteers from north Queensland, while the rest came from Tasmania. A a result initial training was undertaken separately at Brighton, Tasmania, and Redbank, Queensland, before the battalion concentrated at Rutherford, New South Wales, in December 1939, with the Tasmanian contingent sailing from Launceston aboard the SS Taroona. Upon establishment, the battalion's commanding officer was Lieutenant Colonel John Field, who had previously served in the Militia, Australia's part-time military force. The colours chosen for the battalion's unit colour patch (UCP) were the same as those of the 12th Battalion, a unit which had served during World War I before being raised as a Militia formation in 1921. These colours were white over light blue, in a horizontal rectangular shape, although a border of gray was added to the UCP to distinguish the battalion from its Militia counterpart.

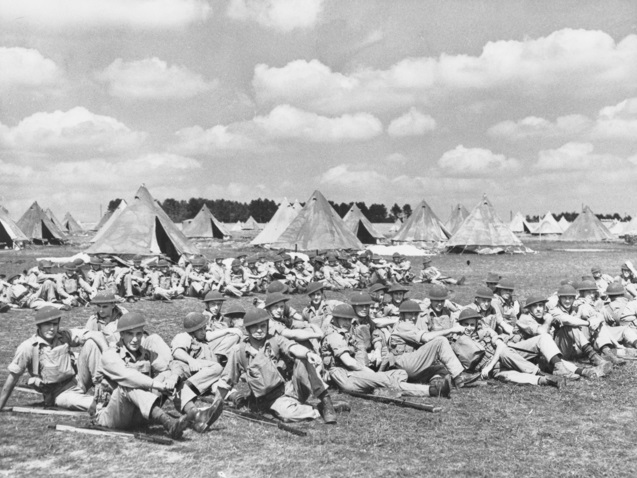
Reinforcements from the 2/12th in England, November 1940

With an authorised strength of around 900 personnel, like other Australian infantry battalions of the time, the battalion was formed around a nucleus of four rifle companies – designated 'A' through to 'D' – each consisting of three platoons. Basic training continued at Rutherford until early January 1940, when the battalion moved to Ingleburn, New South Wales. Apart from a brief period of embarkation leave, the battalion remained at Ingleburn until 5 May 1940 when the 2/12th embarked upon the Queen Mary, bound for the Middle East, along with the rest of the 18th Brigade, where they were to join the 6th Division; however, due to concerns about a possible invasion of the United Kingdom following the Fall of France, the 18th Brigade, including the 2/12th Battalion, was re-routed and subsequently arrived at Gourock, Scotland, on 17 June 1940. Later, they were moved to Salisbury Plain, being stationed around Lopcombe Corner, where they undertook defensive duties. In September the battalion was re-allocated to the 9th Division and the following month it was moved to Colchester, Essex.

=== Middle East ===
In December 1940, after the threat of invasion of the United Kingdom had diminished, the decision was made to transfer the Australian units based there to the Middle East and subsequently the battalion was dispatched to Egypt, sailing aboard the transport Empress of Canada. Sailing via South Africa to avoid the more dangerous waters of the Mediterranean, they disembarked at Alexandria on 31 December and then made camp at Ikingi Maryut. In March, the battalion's medium machine gun section and anti-aircraft platoon provided support to the 2/9th Battalion during its attack on the Italian garrison at Giarabub. The battalion as a whole subsequently saw action at Tobruk between May and August along with the rest of the 18th Brigade, before being relieved by a Polish unit and evacuated by sea to Alexandria in August 1941 aboard the destroyer HMS Jackal. After this, the battalion moved to Biet Jirja and then Kilo 89, in Palestine, where they undertook further training until late September. Following the completion of the Syria-Lebanon campaign, the battalion was assigned to Syria to undertake garrison duties, being based initially around Aleppo and then Djerablous, on the banks of the Euphrates near the Turkish border. Other outposts were established around Idlib, El Hamman, Meidane Ekbes, Azaz, and Radjou.

The battalion returned to Camp Julius in Palestine in mid-January 1942 where they were subsequently reassigned to the 7th Division. With the strategic situation in the Pacific worsening for the Australians after the entry of Japan into the war following the attack on Pearl Harbor and the invasion of Malaya, the decision was made by the Australian government to bring some of the 2nd AIF troops back to Australia at this time. As a result, the 2/12th embarked from Suez in February 1942. Sailing aboard the transport Nieuw Amsterdam, via Bombay and Fremantle, they subsequently arrived at Adelaide, South Australia, in late March, making camp at Sandy Creek.

=== Pacific ===
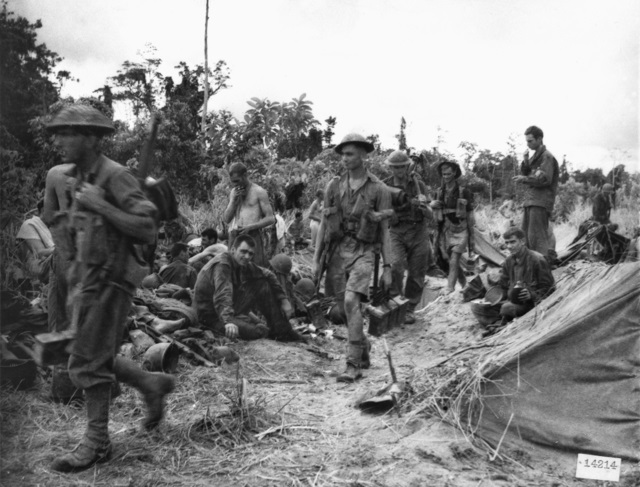
Troops from the 2/12th at Sanananda, January 1943

The battalion moved to Tenterfield, New South Wales in early May after which personnel from Queensland and New South Wales were granted home leave. Later in the month, a further move to Kilcoy, Queensland, occurred after which jungle training began. In August 1942, the 2/12th Battalion was transported to Brisbane where it embarked upon the transports Anshun and Jacob, bound for New Guinea. They were subsequently deployed to Milne Bay, where they took part in the Australian counterattack following the Japanese landing, which resulted in the first major defeat of the Japanese of the war. In October, under the command of Lieutenant Colonel Arthur Arnold, the battalion was selected to invade Goodenough Island. Transported aboard the destroyers HMAS Stuart and Arunta, after a short fight the battalion secured the island. They subsequently remained on Goodenough Island until December. In late December, they were re-committed to the fighting, as the understrength 18th Brigade was sent to Buna, where the 2/12th successfully attacked Giropa Point on New Years Day 1943, despite losing 63 men killed and 122 wounded. After this, the battalion took part in further actions around Sanananda, where they suffered a further 61 men killed in action. The battalion's involvement in the fighting lasted until late January 1943 when it was withdrawn to Soputa by road, and then by air to Port Moresby. In early March, the battalion returned to Australia aboard the transports Taroona and Maetsuycker.

Disembarking in Cairns, Queensland, the battalion subsequently made camp at Ravenshoe, Queensland. Following a period of rest, training and re-organisation, in July 1943 the battalion received a batch of reinforcements from the 5th Motor Regiment, which had been disbanded. A small batch of reinforcements also came from 2/40th Battalion personnel who had evaded capture in Timor. In August 1943, the 2/12th were sent to Port Moresby, where the 18th Brigade was being held in divisional reserve, while the rest of the 7th Division defended the approaches to Lae as part of the Finisterre Range campaign. On the last day of the year, the battalion was committed to the fighting in Finisterre Mountains. They were subsequently joined by the rest of the brigade on 4 January 1944 when it was airlifted to Dumpu to relieve the 21st Brigade. Throughout early 1944, the 2/12th was involved in the fighting around Shaggy Ridge, where they undertook several attacks to the north of the ridge, around the Protheroe I and II features between 21 and 24 January. Between February and April, they continued operations in the Ramu Valley, undertaking patrols before returning to Australia aboard the transport Pahud in May 1944.

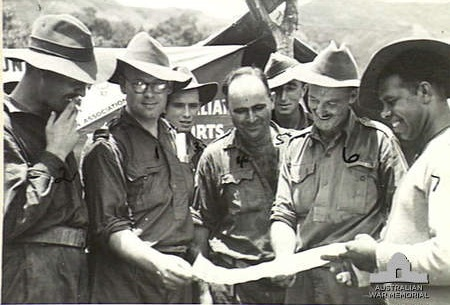
War correspondent and caricaturist Alex Gurney (second from left) presenting the original art work of one of his Bluey and Curley comic strips to men of the 2/12th Battalion at Kesawai, Ramu Valley, New Guinea, 5 March 1944. (Note: This photograph, held by the Australian War Museum, was taken at the same time, with the same subjects, and in the same location as , and .)

A long period of training in Queensland, around Brisbane and then on the Atherton Tablelands, followed before they were dispatched along with the rest of the 7th Division to take part in the landing on Balikpapan in July 1945, under the command of Lieutenant Colonel Charles Bourne. The battalion's involvement in the fighting on Borneo was only brief, however. Despite being landed in the wrong position on 1 July, the 2/12th secured its objectives with very few casualties—losing three killed and 13 wounded and inflicting 103 killed on the opposing Japanese forces on the first day—helping the 18th Brigade secure the high ground overlooking the landing beach at Klandasan before continuing on towards their main objectives. By 3 July Balikpapan had fallen, and two days later the battalion ceased active operations. They remained on Borneo until the end of the war. When the demobilisation process began, members of the battalion were progressively returned to Australia for discharge, or were transferred elsewhere for further service. Those that were not, remained with the battalion undertaking garrison duties until the 2/12th was finally disbanded on 1 January 1946.

During the course of the war, a total of 3,491 men served with the 2/12th Battalion of whom 292 were killed in action or died on active service, while a further 590 were wounded. Its members received the following decorations: three Distinguished Service Orders, seven Military Crosses, three Distinguished Conduct Medals, 18 Military Medals and 50 Mentions in Despatches. In addition, two members of the battalion were appointed as Officers of the Order of the British Empire.

== Battle honours ==
The 2/12th received the following battle honours:

- North Africa 1941
- Defence of Tobruk
- The Salient 1941
- South West Pacific 1942-45
- Buna-Gona
- Sanananda Road
- Cape Endaiadere-Sinemi Creek
- Sanananda – Cape Killerton
- Milne Bay
- Goodenough Island
- Liberation of Australian New Guinea
- Shaggy Ridge
- Finisterres
- Borneo
- Balikpapan

In 1961, these battle honours were entrusted to the 12th Battalion, and are now maintained by the 12th/40th Battalion, the Royal Tasmania Regiment.

== Commanding officers ==
The following officers served as commanding officer of the 2/12th Battalion:

- Lieutenant Colonel John Field (13 October 1939 – 7 May 1942);
- Lieutenant Colonel Arthur Arnold (7 June 1942 – 1 August 1943); and
- Lieutenant Colonel Charles Bourne (1 August 1943 – 15 August 1945).

== Notes ==
Footnotes

Citations
