= 2/1st Pioneer Battalion =

Pioneer battalion of the Australian Army

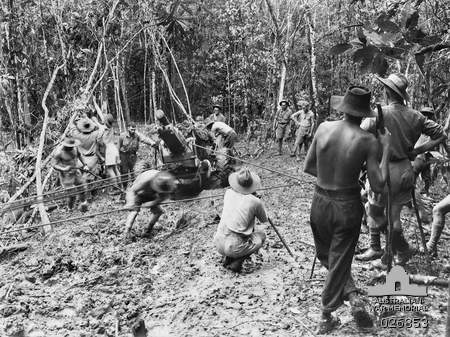
- Troops from the 2/1st Pioneers assist 14th Field Regiment gunners to move a 25-pdr gun up the Kokoda Track, September 1942
- Active: May 1940 – 18 February 1946
- Disbanded: 18 February 1946
- Country: Australia
- Branch: Australian Army
- Type: Pioneer
- Role: Demining; Desert warfare Engineer reconnaissance Force protection Jungle warfare Military engineering Raiding; Trench warfare
- Size: Battalion
- Part of: 6th Division; 9th Division; 7th Division
- Engagements: World War II: North African campaign; New Guinea campaign; Borneo campaign (1945)

Insignia
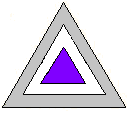
- Unit colour patch

The 2/1st Pioneer Battalion was a pioneer (military) battalion of the Australian Army during World War II. Raised in early 1940, the battalion served throughout the war, seeing action in North Africa, particularly around Tobruk in 1941, before being brought back to Australia in 1942. It later took part in the fighting against the Japanese in New Guinea in 1942–43, and then in Borneo in 1945. It was disbanded in early 1946. The battalion undertook both infantry and engineer tasks.

== History ==
Formed in May 1940, the battalion's initial recruits were drawn from New South Wales, many of whom had previously served in the part-time Militia. Under the command of Lieutenant Colonel Patrick Macgillycuddy, a Staff Corps officer who had served during World War I, the unit completed basic training in various locations across the state including Greta and Dubbo. By June 1940, the battalion had grown to over 900-strong. In late September and early October 1940, the battalion departed for overseas, embarking on two Dutch transports: Johan de Witt from Sydney and Niew Zeeland from Melbourne. It was one of four pioneer battalions raised to provide engineer support to the 2nd Australian Imperial Force's four infantry divisions. Trained as infantry, the battalion undertook both the infantry and engineer support roles and was organised along conventional infantry lines with a headquarters and four companies – designated 'A' through to 'D' – but was made up of personnel with trade or practical skills and, within the divisional structure, the pioneers were administered as corps troops under the direction of the divisional engineer commander.

After arriving in the Middle East in November 1940, the battalion was assigned to the Australian I Corps, serving in Palestine until early 1941. It then moved to the port of Tobruk, where it was allocated to the 6th Division and worked to repair the port's facilities, construct roads and collect captured engineering equipment. When the 6th Division was transferred to Greece, the 2/1st Pioneers remained in North Africa, supporting the 9th Division. The battalion subsequently took part in the Siege of Tobruk, remaining there for five months before being withdrawn when the bulk of Australian forces were relieved in September 1941. Its casualties at Tobruk amounted to 45 killed and 63 wounded; nine personnel were taken prisoner.

In early 1942, the 2/1st returned to Australia as part of the general transfer of Australian ground troops from the Middle East to the Pacific, following Japan's entry into the war. The battalion returned aboard the USS West Point, and subsequently established itself around Ipswich, in Queensland, before being deployed to New Guinea campaign in August aboard the transport Taroona, at the height of the fighting against the Japanese during the Kokoda Track campaign. Initially, the pioneers undertook defensive tasks, with three companies being deployed forward to Owers Corner before moving to Uberi and then on to Imita Ridge, where the Australians sought to make a final stand against the advancing Japanese. There, the battalion occupied the extreme left hand position of a makeshift line alongside the 2/31st, 2/25th, 3rd and 2/33rd Battalions. Later, as the tide of the campaign turned in favour of the Australians, the battalion conducted patrols and portage work along the track from September to November, before being reassigned to carry out mining and labouring work around 9-Mile Quarry, where three companies were deployed. A fourth company was also detached at this time to the Milne Bay area to improve the base's facilities; it remained in New Guinea until October 1943 before returning to Australia for rest and reorganisation aboard the USS Etolin.

A long period of training followed on the Atherton Tablelands in Queensland over the period between late 1943 and early 1945, when the role of the Australian Army gradually diminished in the Pacific as US troops began to arrive in greater numbers. At this time, the 2/1st returned to the command of the 6th Division. Late in the war, the battalion took part in the Borneo campaign of early July 1945, supporting the 7th Division's landing at Balikpapan. Embarking upon the USS General Anderson, the battalion was transferred to Morotai Island in late May 1945, before embarking upon several Landing Ship, Tanks and landing on Balikpapan on 1 July and later carrying out patrols and defensive tasks across the island. On 5 July, the battalion was transported across Balikpapan Bay to Penadjam, to assist the 2/9th Infantry Battalion clear Japanese artillery from the western side of the bay. The 2/1st lost 18 men killed or wounded during the brief campaign.

After the end of the war in August, the battalion was slowly demobilised, as men were returned to Australia individually for discharge. In December 1945, the remaining members of the 2/1st were returned to Australia aboard the Royal Navy aircraft carrier HMS Implacable, and the battalion was eventually disbanded on 18 February 1946, at Ingleburn Camp, New South Wales. After the war, the pioneer role was assumed as a specialisation within the conventional infantry establishment within the Australian Army, and consequently the wartime pioneer battalions have not been re-raised. Members of the battalion received the following decorations: one Officer of the Order of the British Empire, three Military Crosses, two Military Medals, and 13 Mentions in Despatches. The battalion's casualties amounted to 68 killed in action or died on active service, 90 wounded and nine captured.

== Battle honours ==
For its actions during the war, the 2/1st Pioneer Battalion was awarded the following battle honours:

- Defence of Tobruk, The Salient 1941, North Africa 1941, South-West Pacific 1942–43 and South-West Pacific 1945.

== Commanding officers ==
The following officers commanded the 2/1st Pioneers:

- Lieutenant Colonel Patrick Emmett Macgillycuddy (1940);
- Lieutenant Colonel Arnold Brown (1941–43);
- Lieutenant Colonel George John Graham (1943–44);
- Lieutenant Colonel Andrew Adrian Buckley (1944–45);
