= Jack French =

Recipient of the Victoria Cross

John French VC
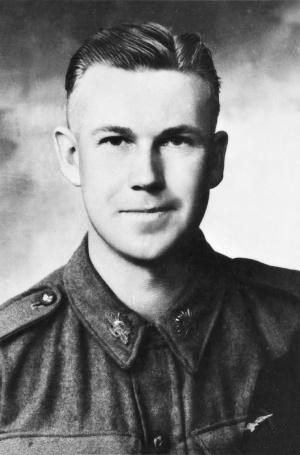
- Jack French in c. 1940
- Born: 15 July 1914; Crows Nest, Queensland, Australia
- Died: 4 September 1942 (aged 28); Milne Bay, Territory of New Guinea
- Military career
- Allegiance: Australia
- Branch: Second Australian Imperial Force
- Service years: 1939–1942
- Rank: Corporal
- Units: 2/9th Infantry Battalion
- Conflicts: Second World War; North African Campaign; Western Desert Campaign; Siege of Giarabub; Siege of Tobruk; Pacific War; New Guinea Campaign; Battle of Milne Bay (DOW)
- Awards: Victoria Cross

John Alexander French, VC (15 July 1914 – 4 September 1942) was an Australian recipient of the Victoria Cross, the highest award for gallantry in the face of the enemy that can be awarded to British and Commonwealth forces. French was one of 20 Australians to receive the award for their actions during the Second World War. He was killed in action fighting against the Japanese during the Battle of Milne Bay in September 1942 while serving with the 2/9th Battalion.

== Early life ==
French was born on 15 July 1914 in Crows Nest, north of Toowoomba in Queensland. His parents were Lucy (née Donaldson) and Albert French. His father was a hairdresser who had moved to the Crows Nest area from Tenterfield, New South Wales, while his mother had originally come from Charleville, Queensland.

In his formative years, French had a reputation as a good sportsman, excelling particularly at rugby league. He was also known for his sense of fair play, with one of his childhood friends, Alf Blinco, recounting the story of how French had exonerated him when he had been falsely accused of stealing by finding the real perpetrators. At age six, French attended the Crows Nest State Primary School, continuing his schooling there until 1928 when he gained a scholarship to further his education by successfully passing a scholarship examination. After this, French attended the Toowoomba State High School and Toowoomba Technical College. In 1929, after completing his schooling, he joined his father's business, commencing an apprenticeship.

== Second World War ==
After the outbreak of the Second World War, French enlisted in the Second Australian Imperial Force on 22 October 1939, the first in Crow's Nest to do so. As a Queenslander, French was posted to the 2/9th Battalion, the first infantry battalion raised in Queensland during the war. In early May 1940, after completing training at Redbank, Queensland, the 2/9th Battalion received orders to deploy overseas. Embarking upon the Mauritania, they sailed to the United Kingdom where the battalion formed part of an Australian contingent – part of the 6th Division – that were to help defend against a possible invasion following the fall of France. The invasion did not eventuate and in late 1940, the battalion – along with the rest of the 18th Brigade – were transferred to the Middle East. They reached Alexandria in late December and shortly after arrival, the battalion became part of the 7th Division.

In March 1941, the 2/9th took part in their first combat action, successfully capturing the Italian fort of Giarabub. The battalion then joined the garrison at Tobruk as it was surrounded by German forces, taking part in several actions before being withdrawn in August. They briefly trained in Palestine before being sent to Syria, where they undertook garrison duties following the capitulation of Vichy French forces. French was promoted to corporal in December.

In early 1942, in response to the growing threat posed by Japan's entry into the war following the attacks on Pearl Harbor and Malaya, the 2/9th Battalion, along with the rest of the 7th Division, was brought back to Australia. At this time they were eventually granted seven days' leave, and French returned to Australia and Crow's Nest. This leave was the final time his family saw him alive. This was followed by further training as the Australian Army reorganised for jungle warfare, before the 2/9th were committed to the fighting against the Japanese in New Guinea.

=== Victoria Cross ===
John Alexander French's Grave at the Bomana War Cemetery, Port Moresby

In late August 1942, the 2/9th Battalion was deployed to the Milne Bay area of New Guinea. The Japanese were advancing south along the Kokoda Track and Allied intelligence had predicted an attack around Milne Bay. In early September, the battalion took part in heavy fighting after the Japanese landed a force to capture the Allied airfields situated there. It was during this fighting that French performed the deeds that led to him being awarded the Victoria Cross. The citation for French's VC award reads as follows:

At Milne Bay New Guinea, on the afternoon of 4 September 1942, a company of Australian Infantry battalion attacked a Japanese position where it encountered terrific rifle and machine-gun fire. The advance of the section, of which Corporal French was in command, was held up by fire from three enemy machine-gun posts, whereupon Corporal French, ordering his section to take cover, advanced and silenced one of the posts with grenades. He returned to his section for more grenades and again advanced and silenced the second post. Armed with a Thompson sub-machine gun, he then attacked the third post, firing from the hip as he went forward.

He was seen to be badly wounded by fire from this post, but he continued to advance. Enemy guns then ceased fire and his section pushed on to find that all the members of the three enemy gun crews had been killed, and that Corporal French had died in front of the third gun pit.

By his cool courage and disregard of his own personal safety, this non-commissioned officer saved members of his section from heavy casualties and was responsible for the successful conclusion of the attack.

The fighting around Milne Bay eventually resulted in Japanese withdrawal, and represented the first full-scale defeat of the Japanese on land during the war. Although French's Victoria Cross was gazetted first, his award was actually the second for actions on Australian territory (due to Papua New Guinea being under Australian Government jurisdiction), as Bruce Kingsbury received his VC for actions near Isurava on the Kokoda Track on 29 August 1942. French is buried at the Bomana War Cemetery at Port Moresby. He was survived by his fiancée Dulcie McCahon. Two of his brothers also served during the war: Eric in the Army, and Gordon, who was killed in action in August 1943 in Europe, in the Royal Australian Air Force.

== Legacy ==
The library at Crows Nest is called the John French V.C. Memorial Library.

The John French Estate and Memorial Park in Gaythorne, Brisbane, which is named in his honour, opened on 10 April 2003.

The John French VC Bridge on the Toowoomba Range crossing was unveiled in September 2019.

The John French VC Bridge (over Downfall Creek) on Kittyhawk Drive, Chermside was erected by Brisbane City Council.

== Personal life ==
French was a cousin (first cousin, once removed) of George Cross recipient Eric George Bailey.
