= USS West Point =

USS West Point has been the name of more than one United States Navy ship, and may refer to:

- USS West Point (ID-3254), a cargo ship in commission from 1918 to 1919
- USS West Point (AP-23), a troop transport in commission from 1941 to 1946
