= Ikingi Maryut =

Coordinates: 31°00′N 29°46′E

Ikingi Maryut is an area in the Western Desert, outside Alexandria, Egypt. It was the site of an Allied staging camp during World War II. Ikingi Maryout also contains a rest house for the king
