= Sanananda =

Coordinates: 8°38′S 148°22′E

Sanananda is a village on the coast of Oro Province, Papua New Guinea.

== History ==
Sanananda was occupied by the Imperial Japanese Army in 1942 during World War II and became a heavily fortified defensive area. It was liberated by the Australian Army and US Army on 18 January 1943 during the Battle of Buna-Gona.
