= Battle of Milne Bay order of battle =

Overview of the order of battle for the Battle of Milne Bay

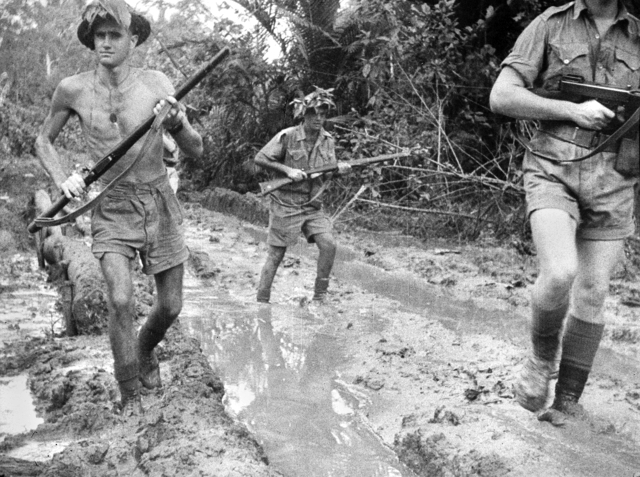
Australian troops at Milne Bay

This is an order of battle listing the Japanese and Allied forces involved in the Battle of Milne Bay from 25 August – 7 September 1942.

== Japanese forces ==
=== 8th Fleet ===
Vice Admiral Gunichi Mikawa

=== Assault Force ===
Rear Admiral Mitsaharu Matsuyama

- 18th Cruiser Division
  Rear Admiral Mitsaharu Matsuyama
  - Japanese cruiser Tenryū
  - Japanese cruiser Tatsuta
- 29th Destroyer Division
  - Japanese destroyer Urakaze
  - Japanese destroyer Tanikaze
  - Japanese destroyer Hamakaze
- 23rd Submarine Chaser Division
  - CH-22
  - CH-24
- Transport Group
  - Nankai Maru
  - Kinai Maru
- Landing Force
  - 5th Kure Special Naval Landing Force
  - 5th Sasebo Special Naval Landing Force (part)
  - 19th Establishment Unit (part)
  - 8th Signals Unit (part)

Source: Bullard, Steven (2007). Japanese Army Operations in the South Pacific Area New Britain and Papua Campaigns, 1942–43. Senshi Sōshō (translated excerpts). Canberra, Australian Capital Territory: Australian War Memorial. p. 169. ISBN 978-0-9751904-8-7. Archived from the original on 2009-04-09.

== Allied forces ==
=== Milne Force ===
Major General Cyril Clowes

Headquarters

- Headquarters, Milne Bay Force
- Headquarters, Royal Australian Engineers, Milne Bay Force
- Headquarters, Signals, Milne Bay Force
- Headquarters, Australian Army Service Corps, Milne Bay Force

Artillery

- 9th Battery, 2/5th Field Regiment
- 4th Battery, 101st Anti-Tank Regiment
- 2/6th Heavy Anti-Aircraft Battery
- Section, 23rd Heavy Anti-Aircraft Battery
- Headquarters, 33rd Heavy Anti-Aircraft Battery
- 440th Heavy Anti-Aircraft Gun Station
- 441st Heavy Anti-Aircraft Gun Station
- 2/9th Light Anti-Aircraft Battery (less E Troop), an Independent Battery of the 2/3rd Light Anti-Aircraft Regiment
- Detachment, Signals, 2/3rd Light Anti-Aircraft Regiment
- Detachment, 3rd Light Anti-Aircraft Workshop Section, 2/3rd Light Anti-Aircraft Regiment

Engineers

- 24th Field Company
- 2/4th Field Company
- Detachment, No. 2 Dock Operating Company
- No. 5 Section, 1st Bomb Disposal Company

Signals

- Headquarters Company, Milne Force Signals
- No. 1 Company, Milne Force Signals
- Headquarters No. 2 Company, Milne Force Signals
- Headquarters No. 3 Company, Milne Force Signals
- Detachment, New Guinea Force Signals

Infantry

- 7th Infantry Brigade Defence Platoon

Supply and Transport

- 25th Company, Australian Army Service Corps
- 2/6th Company, Australian Army Service Corps

Ordnance

- 101st Independent Brigade Group Ordnance Workshop
- 101st Independent Brigade Group Ordnance Field Park
- 18th Brigade Section, 7th Division Ordnance Workshop
- 18th Brigade Section, 7th Division Ordnance Field Park
- 123rd Forward Ordnance Depot
- 23rd Forward Ammunition Depot

Medical

- 11th Field Ambulance
- 2/5th Field Ambulance
- 101st Casualty Clearing Station
- 308th Dental Unit
- 368th Dental Unit

Miscellaneous

- Detachment, Australian Defence Canteens Service
- Detachment, Australian New Guinea Administrative Unit

==== 7th Infantry Brigade ====
- Headquarters, 7th Infantry Brigade
- J Section, Signals
- 241st Light Aid Detachment
- 9th Infantry Battalion
- 25th Infantry Battalion
- 61st Infantry Battalion
- 7th Brigade Provost Section
- 68th Field Post Office

==== 18th Infantry Brigade ====
- Headquarters, 18th Infantry Brigade
- 11 Platoon, Headquarters Guard Battalion
- J Section, Signals, 7th Division
- 2/47th Light Aid Detachment
- 2/9th Infantry Battalion
- 2/10th Infantry Battalion
- 2/12th Infantry Battalion
- 5th Section, 7th Division Provost Company
- Detachment, 7th Division Postal Unit
- Detachment, 7th Division Field Cash Office

==== United States Army Units ====
- Platoon, 101st Coast Artillery (Anti-Aircraft) Battalion
- C Battery, 104th Coast Artillery (Anti-Aircraft) Battalion
- 709th Airborne Anti-Aircraft Artillery Battery
- Company E, 46th Engineers
- 43rd Engineers (less Headquarters and E Company)
- Port Detachment
- Company A, 394th Quartermaster Battalion
- Station Hospital

=== Allied Air Forces ===
==== RAAF ====
- No. 75 Squadron RAAF
- No. 76 Squadron RAAF
- RAAF Operating Base
- RAAF Signals
- No. 37 Radio Station

==== US Army Air Corps ====
- 8th Fighter Control Squadron
- 694th Signal Plotting Platoon

Source:"War Diary, 11th Division General Staff Branch, August 1942, Appendix A, AWM52, 1/5/25-001" (PDF). Australian War Memorial.
