= Battle of Milne Bay =

Battle of World War II

- Part of the New Guinea campaign of the Pacific Theater (World War II)
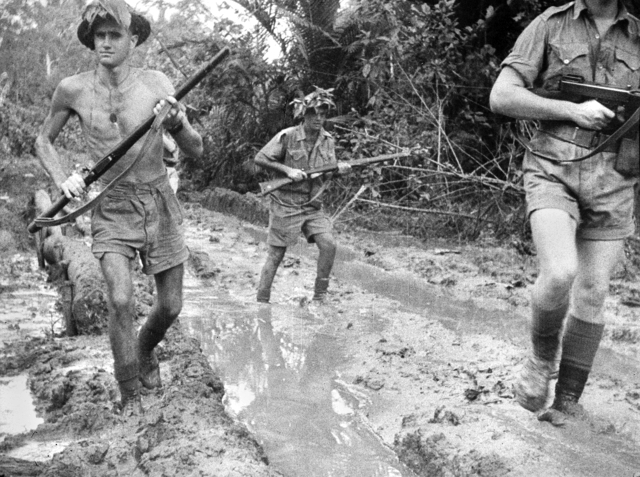
- Australian troops at Milne Bay in 1942, shortly after the battle
Date	25 August – 7 September 1942
Location	Milne Bay, Territory of Papua 10.32°S 150.48°E
Result	Allied victory

Belligerents
Australia; United States	Japan

Commanders and leaders
(Australia) Cyril Clowes	(Empire of Japan) Gunichi Mikawa; (Empire of Japan) Shojiro Hayashi †; (Empire of Japan) Minoru Yano (WIA)

Units involved
(Australia) 7th Infantry Brigade; 9th Battalion; 25th Battalion; 61st Battalion; (Australia) 14th Infantry Brigade; 55th Battalion; (Australia) 18th Infantry Brigade; 2/9th Battalion; 2/10th Battalion; 2/12th Battalion; (Australia) RAAF; No. 75 Squadron RAAF; No. 76 Squadron RAAF; Support elements of: (Australia) 101st Anti-Tank Regiment (Australia) 9 Battery, 2/3rd Light Anti-Aircraft Regiment (Australia) 2/5th Field Regiment (United States) 46th Engineers Battalion (United States) 101st Coast Artillery Battalion (Anti-Aircraft) (Georgia Army National Guard)	(Empire of Japan) Special Naval Landing Force; 3rd Kure SNLF; 5th Kure SNLF; 5th Sasebo SNLF; 5th Yokosuka SNLF; Naval support from: * (Empire of Japan) 8th Fleet: 18th Cruiser Division; 29th Destroyer Division

Strength
8,824	1,943 land troops with tanks

Casualties and losses
Australia: 167 killed or missing; 206 wounded; United States: 14 killed	625 killed; 311 wounded

The Battle of Milne Bay (25 August – 7 September 1942), also known as Operation RE or the Battle of Rabi (ラビの戦い) by the Japanese, was a battle of the Pacific campaign of World War II. Japanese naval infantry, known as Kaigun Tokubetsu Rikusentai (Special Naval Landing Forces), with two small tanks attacked the Allied airfields at Milne Bay that had been established on the eastern tip of New Guinea. Due to poor intelligence work, the Japanese miscalculated the size of the predominantly Australian garrison and, believing that the airfields were defended by only two or three companies, initially landed a force roughly equivalent in size to one battalion on 25 August 1942. The Allies, forewarned by intelligence from Ultra, had heavily reinforced the garrison.

Despite suffering a significant setback at the outset, when part of their small invasion force had its landing craft destroyed by Royal Australian Air Force aircraft as they attempted to land on the coast behind the Australian defenders, the Japanese quickly pushed inland and began their advance towards the airfields. Heavy fighting followed as they encountered the Australian Militia troops that formed the first line of defence. These troops were steadily pushed back, but the Australians brought forward veteran Second Australian Imperial Force units that the Japanese had not expected. Allied air superiority helped tip the balance, providing close support to troops in combat and targeting Japanese logistics. Finding themselves heavily outnumbered, lacking supplies and suffering heavy casualties, the Japanese withdrew their forces, with fighting coming to an end on 7 September 1942.

The battle is often described as the first major battle of the war in the Pacific in which Allied troops decisively defeated Japanese land forces. Although Japanese land forces had experienced local setbacks elsewhere in the Pacific earlier in the war, unlike at Milne Bay, these earlier actions had not forced them to withdraw completely and abandon their strategic objective. Nor did they have such a profound impact upon the thoughts and perceptions of the Allies towards the Japanese, and their prospects for victory. Milne Bay showed the limits of Japanese capability to expand using relatively small forces in the face of increasingly larger Allied troop concentrations and command of the air. As a result of the battle, Allied morale was boosted and Milne Bay was developed into a major Allied base, which was used to mount subsequent operations in the region.

== Background ==
=== Geography ===
Milne Bay is a sheltered 250-square-kilometre (97 sq mi) bay at the eastern tip of the Territory of Papua (now part of Papua New Guinea). It is 35 kilometres (22 mi) long and 16 kilometres (10 mi) wide, and is deep enough for large ships to enter. The coastal area is flat with good aerial approaches, and therefore suitable for airstrips, although it is intercut by many tributaries of rivers and mangrove swamps. Owing to the swampy lands and high rainfall, about 5,100 millimetres (200 in) per year, the area is prone to malaria and flooding. After floods, the coastal plains become "virtually impassable quagmires of glutinous mud", and the ground is not suited for development. The bay is bounded to its north and south by the Stirling Ranges, which at points rise 900–1,500 metres (3,000–5,000 ft) and are covered in Kunai grass and dense scrubland.

The main area of firm ground suitable for construction and development is found directly at the head of the bay. In 1942 this area was occupied by plantations of palm oil, coconuts and cocoa, as well as a number of jetties and villages, connected by what was described by Major Sydney Elliott-Smith of the Australian New Guinea Administrative Unit (ANGAU) as a "modest 'road' system" that was, in actuality, only a dirt track 10–12 metres (33–39 ft) wide. The area was sparsely populated, although there were a number of villages along the track. Ahioma was situated the farthest east, and together with Gili Gili in the west, it bounded Lilihoa, Waga Waga, Goroni, KB Mission, Rabi and Kilarbo.

=== Military situation ===
The Japanese thrust into the Pacific region had begun in early December 1941 with attacks against British and Commonwealth forces in the Battle of Hong Kong and the Malayan campaign, and against the US Pacific Fleet, much of which was caught at anchor in Pearl Harbor. They rapidly advanced south, overwhelming resistance in Malaya, capturing Singapore in February 1942, and successfully occupying Timor, Rabaul and the Dutch East Indies. While a Japanese naval operation aimed at capturing Port Moresby was defeated in the Battle of the Coral Sea in May, elsewhere American forces in the Philippines capitulated, and Japanese forces advanced towards India through Burma.

Although the Japanese had been defeated in the Coral Sea, another attempt at capturing Port Moresby was anticipated. The Allied Supreme Commander of the South West Pacific Area, General Douglas MacArthur, decided to establish airbases to protect Port Moresby. To the west, he authorised the construction of an airbase at Merauke in Netherlands New Guinea. Another, codenamed "Boston", was authorised to the east in the largely unexplored Abau–Mullins Harbour area on 20 May. Any Japanese force approaching Port Moresby by sea would have to sail past these bases, allowing them to be detected and attacked earlier; but the base in the east had other advantages too. Bombers flying missions to Rabaul and other Japanese bases to the north from there would not have to overfly the Owen Stanley Range, and would not be subject to the vagaries of the weather and air turbulence over the mountains. For that reason, an airstrip suitable for heavy bombers was desired so that they could stage there from Port Moresby and bases in northern Australia.

The Commander in Chief of Allied Land Forces, General Sir Thomas Blamey, selected a garrison for Boston on 24 May. The troops were informed that their mission was only to defend against Japanese raids, and in the event of a major attack they would destroy everything of value and withdraw. The Boston project fell through, as a reconnaissance of the area gave an unfavourable report and Elliott-Smith suggested Milne Bay as a more suitable alternative site. A party of twelve Americans and Australians set out to explore Milne Bay in a Consolidated PBY Catalina flying boat on 8 June. They were impressed by the flat areas, the roads and the jetties, all of which would ease airbase construction. On receipt of a favourable report from the party, MacArthur's General Headquarters (GHQ) cancelled Boston on 11 June and substituted Milne Bay. Milne Bay was given the codename "Fall River". The use of place names as code names proved to be unwise, as some supplies were mistakenly sent to the real Fall River, in Massachusetts.

== Prelude ==
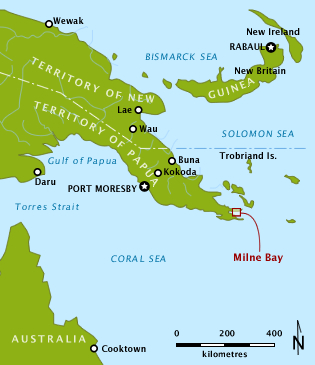
Location of Milne Bay within Territory of Papua, 1942. The highlighted area is enlarged below.

=== Allies ===
The first troops arrived at Milne Bay from Port Moresby in the Dutch KPM ships Karsik and Bontekoe, escorted by the sloop HMAS Warrego and the corvette HMAS Ballarat on 25 June. Karsik docked at a pontoon wharf that had been hastily constructed from petrol drums by Papuan workers, who had been recruited by ANGAU and who subsequently assisted in unloading the ships. The troops included two and a half companies and a machine gun platoon from the 55th Infantry Battalion of the 14th Infantry Brigade, the 9th Light Anti-Aircraft Battery with eight Bofors 40 mm guns, a platoon of the US 101st Coast Artillery Battalion (Anti-Aircraft) with eight .50 calibre machine guns, and two 3.7 inch anti-aircraft guns of the 23rd Heavy Anti-Aircraft Battery. Company E of the 46th Engineers of the US Army Corps of Engineers arrived on Bontekoe with airbase construction equipment. Some 29 KPM ships had escaped to Australia after the fall of the Dutch East Indies. They were manned by Dutch and Javanese crews, and were the lifeline of the garrison at Milne Bay, making roughly two out of every three voyages there during the campaign, the remainder being by Australian, British and US ships. Five KPM ships would be lost during the fighting in Papua.

Work on the first airfield, which became known as No. 1 Airstrip, had commenced on 8 June, with the area near Gili Gili being cleared by Papuan workers under the supervision of ANGAU and by US 96th Engineer Separate Battalion personnel. Company E of the 46th Engineers began working on it on 30 June. In addition to the runway, they had to build camouflaged dispersal areas for 32 fighters, taxiways and accommodation for 500 men. To support the airbase and the garrison, a platoon was diverted to working on the docks and roads. Although the channels in Milne Bay allowed deep draught ships to approach within 12 metres (40 ft) of the shore, they had to be unloaded onto pontoons and the stores manhandled onto vehicles, a labour-intensive process.

Three P-40 Kittyhawks from No. 76 Squadron RAAF landed on the airstrip on 22 July, while additional aircraft from No. 76 and also No. 75 Squadron RAAF arrived on 25 July. They found that only 1,510 by 20 metres (4,950 by 80 ft) of the 1,830-by-30-metre (6,000 by 100 ft) runway was covered with Marston Matting, and that water was frequently over it. Landing aircraft sprayed water about, and sometimes skidded off the runway and became bogged down.

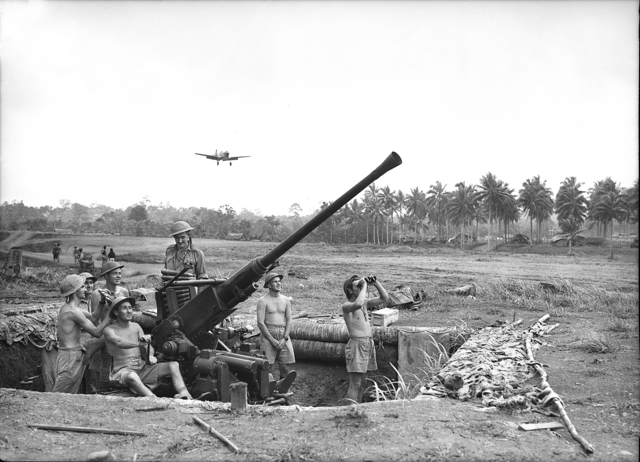
A Kittyhawk comes in to land at No. 1 Airstrip, guarded by a Bofors 40 mm anti-aircraft gun of the 2/9th Light Anti-Aircraft Battery.

With No. 1 Airstrip operational, work began on two more airfields. Some 5,000 coconut trees were removed for No. 2 Airstrip, and the site was levelled and graded, but its use first required the construction of at least two 18-metre (60 ft) bridges, so work moved to No. 3 Airstrip near Kilarbo. Its construction was undertaken by the 2nd Battalion of the US 43rd Engineers (less Company E), which arrived on 4 August. That day Japanese aircraft began to bomb and strafe Milne Bay, focusing upon attacking the airfields and the engineers as they worked. Four Zeros and a dive bomber attacked No. 1 Airstrip. One Kittyhawk was destroyed on the ground, while a Kittyhawk from No. 76 Squadron shot down the dive bomber. Following this, the Australians established a workable radar system to provide early warning. On 11 August 22 Kittyhawks intercepted 12 Zeroes. Despite their numerical advantage, the Australians lost three Kittyhawks, while claiming four Japanese Zeros shot down.

On 11 July, troops of the 7th Infantry Brigade, under the command of Brigadier John Field, began arriving to bolster the garrison. The brigade consisted of three Militia battalions from Queensland: the 9th, 25th and 61st Infantry Battalions. They brought with them guns of the 4th Battery of the 101st Anti-Tank Regiment, the 2/6th Heavy Anti-Aircraft Battery, and the 2/9th Light Anti-Aircraft Battery, along with the first Australian engineer unit, the 24th Field Company. Field assumed command of "Milne Force", a task force which exercised operational control over all Allied air, land and naval forces in the area, but only when an attack was imminent. He reported directly to Blamey's Allied Land Forces in Brisbane rather than New Guinea Force in Port Moresby. His most urgent tasks were of an engineering nature. While the American engineers built the airstrips and wharves, the Australians worked on the roads and accommodation. The small force of sappers had to be augmented by infantry and Papuan labourers.

Although malaria was known to be endemic in the Milne Bay area, precautions taken against the disease were haphazard. Men wore shorts and kept their sleeves rolled up. Their mosquito repellent cream was ineffective, quinine was in short supply and many men arrived without their mosquito nets, which were stowed deep in the ships' holds and took several days to unload. A daily dosage of 650 milligrams (10 gr) was prescribed but Field's troops were told not to take their quinine until they had been in the area a week. By this time, many had become infected with the disease. The Director of Medicine at Allied Land Forces Headquarters was Brigadier Neil Hamilton Fairley, an expert on tropical medicine. He visited Port Moresby in June, and was alarmed at the ineffectiveness of the measures being taken to combat the disease, which he realised was capable of destroying the entire Allied force in Papua. He made sure that the 110th Casualty Clearing Station left Brisbane for Milne Bay with a fully equipped pathological laboratory and a large quantity of anti-malarial supplies, including 200,000 quinine tablets. However, some equipment was lost or ruined in transit, and the danger from malaria was not yet appreciated at Milne Bay.

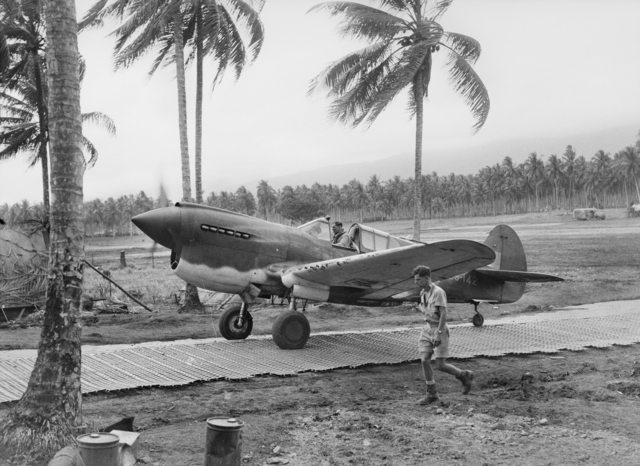
Squadron Leader Keith "Bluey" Truscott, Commanding Officer of No. 76 Squadron RAAF, taxiing along Marston Matting at Milne Bay in September 1942

The 55th Infantry Battalion's companies were already badly afflicted by malaria and other tropical diseases, and were withdrawn and sent back to Port Moresby in early August, but the garrison was further reinforced with Second Australian Imperial Force troops of Brigadier George Wootten's 18th Infantry Brigade of the 7th Division, which began arriving on 12 August, although it would not be complete until 21 August. This veteran brigade, which had fought in the siege of Tobruk earlier in the war, consisted of the 2/9th, 2/10th and 2/12th Infantry Battalions. Anti-aircraft and artillery support was provided by the 9th Battery of the 2/3rd Light Anti-Aircraft Regiment, the US 709th Anti-Aircraft Battery and the 9th Battery of the 2/5th Field Regiment, while various signals and logistics troops provided further support.

With two brigades now at Milne Bay, Major General Cyril Clowes was appointed to command Milne Force, which was placed under the control of New Guinea Force, now commanded by Lieutenant General Sydney Rowell, on 12 August. Clowes' headquarters was formed in Sydney at the end of July and was flown up to Milne Bay. He arrived with some of his staff on 13 August, but had to wait until the rest arrived before he could formally assume command of Milne Force on 22 August. By this time there were 7,459 Australian and 1,365 US Army personnel at Milne Bay, of whom about 4,500 were infantry. There were also about 600 RAAF personnel.

Clowes assigned the inexperienced 7th Infantry Brigade a defensive role, guarding key points around Milne Bay from seaborne or airborne attack, and kept the veteran 18th Infantry Brigade in reserve, ready to counterattack. Lacking accurate maps and finding that their signals equipment was unreliable in the conditions, the Australian command and control system consisted largely of cable telephones, or where there was not enough line available, runners. The soft ground made movement by road and even on foot difficult.

=== Japanese ===
Japanese aircraft soon discovered the Allied presence at Milne Bay, which was appreciated as a clear threat to Japanese plans for another seaborne advance on Port Moresby, which was to start with a landing at Samarai Island in the China Strait, not far from Milne Bay. On 31 July the commander of the Japanese XVII Army, Lieutenant General Harukichi Hyakutake, requested that Vice Admiral Gunichi Mikawa's 8th Fleet capture the new Allied base at Milne Bay instead. Mikawa therefore altered his plans for the Samarai operation, and substituted the capture of Milne Bay, which was codenamed Operation RE, and scheduled for the middle of August. Operation RE received a high priority after aircraft from the 25th Air Flotilla discovered the new Milne Bay airfields on 4 August, but was then postponed due to the American landings on Guadalcanal on 7 August.

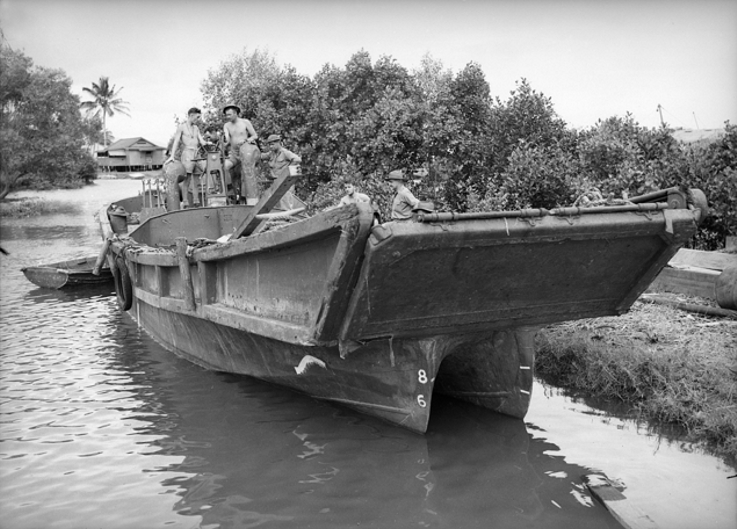
One of the Japanese barges after the battle. The fluted bottom allows the barge to retract from the beach easily.

Under the misconception that the airfields were defended by only two or three companies of Australian infantry (300–600 men), the initial Japanese assault force consisted of only about 1,250 personnel. The Imperial Japanese Army (IJA) was unwilling to conduct the operation as it feared that landing barges sent to the area would be attacked by Allied aircraft. Following an argument between IJA and Imperial Japanese Navy (IJN) officers, it was agreed that the Navy would have responsibility for the landing. As a result, the assault force was drawn from the Japanese naval infantry, known as Kaigun Rikusentai (Special Naval Landing Forces). Some 612 naval troops from the 5th Kure Special Naval Landing Force (SNLF), led by Commander Shojiro Hayashi, were scheduled to land on the east coast near a point identified by the Japanese as "Rabi", along with 197 men from the 5th Sasebo SNLF, led by Lieutenant Fujikawa. It was planned that a further 350 personnel from the 10th Naval Landing Force, along with 100 men from the 2nd Air Advance Party, would land via barge on the northern coast of the peninsula at Taupota, in Goodenough Bay, from where it would strike out over the Stirling Ranges to attack the Australians from behind. Following the battle, the chief of staff of the Japanese Combined Fleet, Vice Admiral Matome Ugaki, assessed that the landing force was not of a high calibre as it contained many 30- to 35-year-old soldiers who were not fully fit and had "inferior fighting spirit". Naval support was to be provided by the 18th Cruiser Division under the command of Rear Admiral Mitsuharu Matsuyama. The Japanese enjoyed some initial advantage in the form of possessing two Type-95 light tanks. After an initial attack, however, these tanks became marooned in the mud and abandoned. They also had control of the sea during the night, allowing reinforcement and evacuation.

=== Allied intelligence advantage ===
Countering these Japanese tactical advantages, the Allies enjoyed the strategic advantage of possessing superior intelligence about Japanese plans. The Japanese knew very little about Allied forces at Milne Bay, while the Allies received advance warning that the Japanese were planning an invasion. In mid-July codebreakers under the command of Commander Eric Nave informed MacArthur that toward the end of August the Japanese planned to attack Milne Bay. They provided detailed information about the numbers of soldiers to expect, which units would be involved, their standard of training, and the names of the ships that the Japanese had allocated to the operation. MacArthur's Assistant Chief of Staff for Intelligence, Brigadier General Charles A. Willoughby, had anticipated a Japanese reaction against Milne Force, and interpreted the Japanese reconnaissance on 4 August as foreshadowing an operation. After Allied Naval Forces signals intelligence, given the code word Ultra, which covered a number of codes including the Japanese naval code JN-25, decrypted a message that disclosed that a Japanese submarine picquet line had been established to cover the approaches to Milne Bay, Willoughby predicted that an attack was imminent. In response, MacArthur rushed the 18th Infantry Brigade to Milne Bay. Major General George Kenney, the commander of the Allied Air Forces, ordered air patrols stepped up over the likely Japanese invasion routes. He also ordered pre-emptive air strikes against the Japanese airfields at Buna on 24 and 25 August, which reduced the number of Japanese fighters available to support the attack on Milne Bay to just six.

== Battle ==
=== Initial landing ===
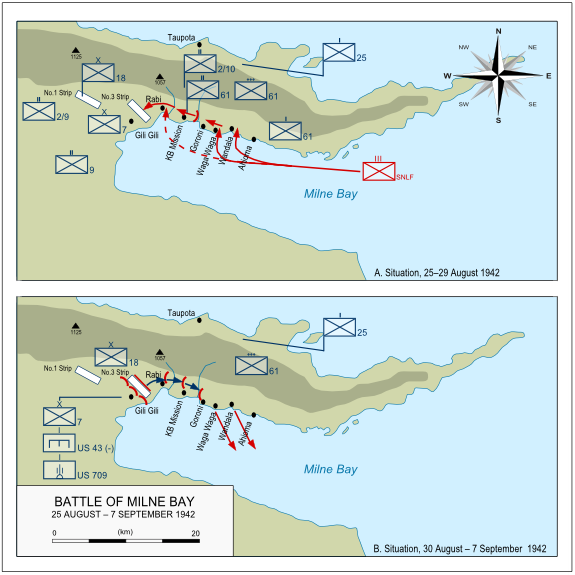
Battle of Milne Bay 25 August – 7 September 1942

Over the course of 23 and 24 August, aircraft from the 25th Air Flotilla carried out preparatory bombing around the airfield at Rabi. The main Japanese invasion force left Rabaul on 24 August, under Matsuyama's command, at 7:00 am. The fleet was made up of two light cruisers, Tenryū and Tatsuta, as well as three destroyers, Urakaze, Tanikaze and Hamakaze, in concert with the transports, Nankai Maru and Kinai Maru, and the submarine chasers CH-22 and CH-24.

At 8:30 am on 24 August, Milne Bay GHQ was alerted by an RAAF Hudson bomber near Kitava Island, off the Trobriand Islands, and coastwatchers that a Japanese convoy was approaching the Milne Bay area. HMAS Arunta – escorting the transport SS Tasman – left the Milne Bay area and sailed for Port Moresby after learning of the invasion force. Reports of the second Japanese convoy, consisting of seven barges, which had sailed from Buna carrying the force that would land at Taupota were also received at this time. In response to this sighting, after the initially poor weather had cleared, 12 RAAF Kittyhawks were scrambled at midday. The barges were spotted beached near Goodenough Island where the 350 troops of the 5th Sasebo SNLF, led by Commander Tsukioka, had gone ashore to rest. The Australian pilots then proceeded to strafe the barges and, over the course of two hours, destroyed them all and stranded their former occupants.

After the initial sighting, the main invasion force, consisting of the heavy naval screening force and the two transports, remained elusive until the morning of 25 August. In an effort to intercept it, US B-17s operating from bases at Mareeba and Charters Towers in Queensland, were dispatched, although they were unable to complete their mission as bad weather closed in. Later in the afternoon, a number of Kittyhawks and a single Hudson bomber strafed the convoy and attempted to bomb the transports with 110 kg (250 lb) bombs near Rabi Island. Only limited damage was caused to the convoy and no ships were sunk. After this, due to the withdrawal of the only Allied naval presence in the area – Arunta and Tasman – an RAAF tender was sent to act as a picket in the bay, ready to provide early warning of the approaching Japanese.

Meanwhile, earlier in the day, Clowes decided to shorten his lines and passed the order for D Company, 61st Infantry Battalion, which had been sent to Akioma in the east, to withdraw back behind 'B' Company at KB Mission and reposition itself at the No. 3 Airstrip at Gili Gili. A shortage of water craft, however, delayed D Company's departure until the evening of 25/26 August after requisitioning three luggers Bronzewing, Elevala and Dadosee. At around 10:30 pm, the Japanese main force, consisting of over 1,000 men and two Type 95 Ha-Go tanks, had made landfall near Waga Waga, on the northern shore of the bay; due to an error in navigation they came ashore about 3 kilometres (1.9 mi) east of where they had intended, placing them further away from their objective. Nevertheless, they quickly sent out patrols to secure the area, rounding up local villagers, and established a beachhead.

Later that evening, two of the small water craft that D Company were using to withdraw to Gili Gili encountered the Japanese landing force. In the firefight that followed, one of the craft – Elevala – was forced to beach and its occupants forced to return by taking to the jungle on foot, eventually reaching Gili Gili some time later; the other, Bronzewing, was holed and of its passengers, 11 were killed either in the engagement or by the Japanese following their capture.

=== Japanese advance inland ===
By dawn of 26 August, advancing west along the coast with armoured support, the Japanese had reached the main position manned by troops from B Company, 61st Infantry Battalion, around KB Mission. The Japanese force moved through the jungle at the edge of the coastal track, and was headed by two light tanks. Although they lacked anti-armour weapons, the Australians were able to turn back the Japanese attack. At this stage, the Japanese suffered a serious setback when their base area was heavily attacked at daylight by RAAF Kittyhawks and a Hudson aircraft, along with B-25s, B-26s and B-17s from the US Fifth Air Force. As a result of the attack, a number of Japanese troops were killed, while a large quantity of supplies was destroyed, as were a number of the landing barges which were beached near the KB Mission. Aside from severely hampering the Japanese supply system, the destruction of the landing barges also prevented their use to outflank the Australian battalions. The Japanese did not have any air cover as the fighters based at Buna which were to patrol over Milne Bay were shot down by Allied fighters shortly after they took off and other aircraft based at Rabaul were forced to turn back due to bad weather.

Nevertheless, the Japanese were still pressing on the 61st Infantry Battalion's positions throughout the day. Field, who had command responsibility for the local area, decided to send two platoons from the 25th Infantry Battalion to provide support. Later, the remaining two rifle companies from the 61st were also dispatched, along with their mortar platoon. The muddy track meant that the Australians were unable to move anti-tank guns into position; however, as a stop-gap measure quantities of sticky bombs and anti-tank mines were moved up to the forward units. At 4:45 pm, with air and artillery support, the Australians launched a minor attack upon the Japanese forward positions which were located about 500 metres (600 yd) to the east of the mission, pushing the Japanese back a further 200 metres (200 yd). Weary from the day's fighting, though, they withdrew to Motieau, west of the mission.

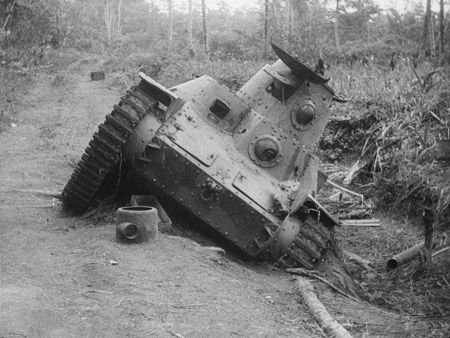
A Japanese Type 95 Ha-Go tank near Rabi, bogged in the mud and abandoned

The Australians then attempted to break contact and withdraw towards a creek line where they hoped to establish a defensive line as darkness came. The Japanese stayed in close contact with the Australians, harassing their rear elements. The men from B Company then sought to establish their position, while the 2/10th Infantry Battalion made preparations to move eastwards towards Ahioma, passing through the lines of the 25th and 61st Infantry Battalions. In the early evening, Japanese ships shelled the Australian positions and later, at 10:00 pm, the Japanese launched a heavy attack on the Australians which continued sporadically through the night. By 4:00 am the following morning, the Japanese began to employ infiltration and deception techniques to try to outflank the Australian positions. Anticipating an armoured attack at dawn, the Australians withdrew back to the Gama River, which was situated 1.6 kilometres (1 mi) to the west. During the night, the destroyer Hamakaze entered the bay to make contact with the Japanese troops and land supplies. The landing force had been out of radio contact since 2:00 pm, and the destroyer was unable to raise it with either her radio or visual signalling devices. As a result, Hamakaze departed Milne Bay at 2:30 am without having landed any supplies.

Shortly after dawn, in the air, a Japanese force consisting of eight dive bombers with 12 Zero fighter escorts attacked the Allied airfield at Gili Gili. One of the attacking aircraft was shot down, while only a small amount of damage was inflicted. Meanwhile, around the mission as the Japanese reconnoitred Australian positions, the 2/10th Infantry Battalion, consisting of just 420 men, was ordered to the Gama River by Clowes. This operation was badly planned and did not have a clear purpose; it was launched as both a reconnaissance in force and a counter-attack, but evolved into an attempt to establish a blocking force at KB Mission. Moreover, while the Australians had no knowledge of the strength or intentions of the Japanese, no force would be able to reinforce the battalion once it moved outside the main defensive lines near the airstrips. The 2/10th's forward patrols made contact with the 61st Infantry Battalion at around 10:30 am on 27 August and, upon arrival at around 5:00 pm, they began to establish their position; with only limited entrenching tools, they found the going difficult. At this point, the troops from the 25th and 61st Battalion were ordered to pull back, having lost 18 men killed and a further 18 wounded, along with an unknown number missing in action.

At 8:00 pm the Japanese sent two Type 95 tanks with bright headlights into the plantation. The men from the 2/10th tried to disable them with sticky bombs, but due to the humid conditions the bombs failed to adhere to the Japanese armour. In the fighting that followed over the course of two and a half hours, the Australians suffered heavy casualties. Receiving indirect fire support from the 2/5th Field Regiment's 25 pounder guns situated near Gili Gili, they repelled four frontal attacks. However, by midnight the Japanese were inside the Australian position and in the confusion the 2/10th withdrew in some disorder to a number of scattered positions on the west bank of the Gama, which they reached by about 2:00 am on 28 August. A further assault, however, by tank-mounted infantry forced them back further, moving back through the 61st and 25th Infantry Battalions towards No. 3 Airstrip, which was still under construction, south of Kilarbo. During the brief engagement around KB Mission, they had lost 43 men killed and another 26 wounded.

As the 2/10th withdrew, the 25th Infantry Battalion, which had moved forward from Gili Gili to relieve the 61st, deployed around the airstrip and at Rabi, Duira Creek and Kilarbo, laying mines in key locations. The airstrip proved a perfect defensive location, offering a wide, clear field of fire, while at its end, thick mud served to prevent the movement of Japanese tanks. Around dawn the advancing Japanese troops reached the airstrip and, under the cover of field artillery and mortars, they launched an attack. Although the Australians did not know it, the tanks that were supporting the attack became stuck in the mud and were subsequently abandoned; they would later be discovered by an Australian patrol on 29 August. Meanwhile, troops from the 25th and 61st Infantry Battalions, along with Americans from the 709th Anti-Aircraft Battery, turned back the attacking Japanese infantry. Further strafing by Kittyhawks followed, and the Japanese were forced to fall back 2 kilometres (1.2 mi) to the east of Rabi.

Following this, for the next two days there was a lull in the fighting. During this time, the Australians consolidated their defences. The 61st Infantry Battalion, despite being seriously depleted from the previous fighting, were ordered back to the perimeter around the airstrip, subsequently deploying around Stephen's Ridge, tying in with the 25th Battalion's positions between the coast and Wehria Creek. Fire support was provided by mortars from the 25th along with Vickers machine guns from the 61st and .30 and .50 calibre machine guns mounted on the American half-tracks. The American engineers and anti-aircraft gunners became the first American troops to engage in ground combat in New Guinea.

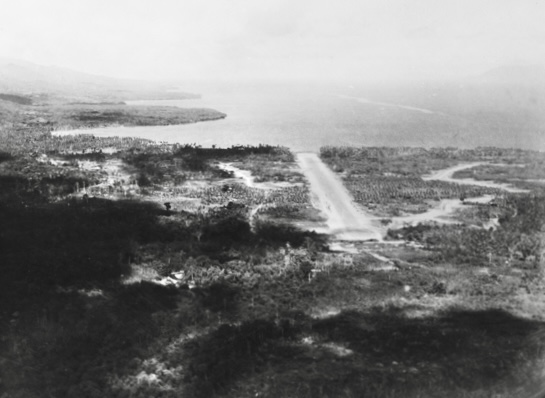
No. 3 Airstrip with Stephen's Ridge in the foreground

Elsewhere, the 2/12th Infantry Battalion began moving forward from Waigani to enable it to join the fighting later as a counterattacking force. They, along with the 2/9th, were subsequently tasked to carry out an attack from No. 3 Airstrip to KB Mission. Meanwhile, the Japanese also sought to reconfigure their forces and Mikawa decided to reinforce the forces that were already ashore. These reinforcements, consisting of 567 men from the 3rd Kure SNLF and 200 from the 5th Yokosuka SNLF, left Rabaul on 28 August. At around 4:30 pm an RAAF patrol spotted the Japanese convoy – consisting of one cruiser and nine destroyers – and subsequently reported this to the Allied headquarters. Believing that further landings were about to occur, Clowes cancelled his plans to begin a counterattack with the troops from the 18th Brigade. Orders were also passed for the 30 Kittyhawks at Gili Gili to be flown off to Port Moresby in case the Japanese succeeded in breaking through to the airfield. The attack did not take place, though, and consequently early in the morning on 29 August they returned, albeit minus two aircraft which had crashed during the move.

The Japanese convoy arrived off Waga Waga at 8:15 pm on 29 August, and began landing troops and supplies. While this was taking place the warships shelled Allied positions around Gili Gili and by 11:30 pm, had completed their landing. The shelling was not significant, however, and no casualties resulted from it. Throughout 30 August, the Australians carried out patrolling operations while the Japanese laid up in the jungle in preparation for an attack that night.

Later that night the Japanese began forming up along the track at the eastern end of No. 3 Airstrip by the sea, and at 3:00 am on 31 August they launched their attack. Advancing over open ground and illuminated by flares fired by the Australians, the first Japanese attack was repelled by heavy machine gun and mortar fire from 25th and 61st Infantry Battalions as well as the 46th Engineer General Service Regiment, and artillery fire from the Australian 2/5th Field Regiment. A further two banzai charges were attempted only to meet the same fate, with heavy Japanese casualties, including the Japanese commander, Hayashi. At this point, Commander Minoru Yano, who had arrived with the Japanese reinforcements on 29 August, took over from Hayashi, and after the survivors of the attack had reformed in the dead ground around Poin Creek, he led them about 200 metres (200 yd) north of the airstrip in an attempt to outflank the 61st Infantry Battalion's positions on Stephen's Ridge. After running into a platoon of Australians who engaged them with Bren light machine guns, the Japanese withdrew just before dawn to the sounds of a bugle call. The Japanese troops who survived this attack were shocked by the heavy firepower the Allied forces had been able to deploy, and the assault force was left in a state of disarray.

=== Australian counterattack ===
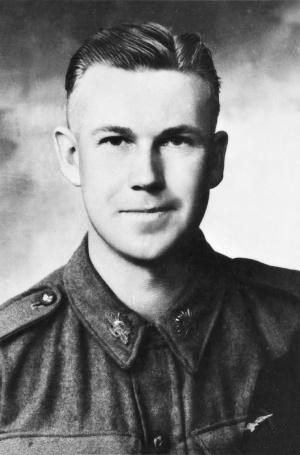
John French, posthumously awarded the Victoria Cross for his actions at Milne Bay

Early on 31 August, the 2/12th Infantry Battalion began moving towards KB Mission, with 'D' Company leading the way and struggling through muddy conditions along the track, which had been turned into a quagmire due to the heavy rain and equally heavy traffic. After passing through the 61st Infantry Battalion's position, at around 9:00 am they began their counterattack along the north coast of Milne Bay. As the Australians went they were harassed by snipers and ambush parties. They also encountered several Japanese soldiers who tried to lure the Australians in close for attack by pretending to be dead. In response, some Australians systematically bayoneted and shot the bodies of Japanese soldiers. At noon, the 9th Infantry Battalion, a Militia unit from the 7th Infantry Brigade, dispatched two companies to occupy some of the ground that the 2/12th had regained around No. 3 Airstrip and the mission.

Making slow going amidst considerable resistance, the Australians nevertheless reached KB Mission late in the day. A force of Japanese remained there, and the Australians attacked with bayonets fixed. In the fighting that followed 60 Japanese were killed or wounded. The Australians were then able to firmly establish themselves at the mission. Meanwhile, the two companies from the 9th Battalion took up positions at Kilarbo and between the Gama River and Homo Creek with orders to establish blocking positions to allow the 2/12th to continue its advance the following morning.

That night, a force of around 300 Japanese who had been falling back since they had run into the 61st Infantry Battalion on Stephen's Ridge, encountered positions manned by the 2/12th and 9th Infantry Battalions around the Gama River. In a surprise attack, the Australians inflicted heavy casualties on the Japanese. After the battle the Australians estimated that up to 90 had been killed. Following this the Japanese began to employ infiltration techniques in an attempt to pass through the numerous listening posts that had been set up along the side of the track which formed the front of one side of the 2/12th's position. Elsewhere, at the mission, starting at around 8:00 pm, they carried out harassment operations in an effort to distract the Australians and assist their comrades to try to break through the Australian positions from the Gama River. This lasted throughout the night.

The following morning, 1 September, the 2/12th Infantry Battalion went on the offensive again, while a force of seven Kittyhawks attacked the Japanese headquarters around Waga Waga. By this time, the Japanese had abandoned the objective of reaching the airfields and instead sought only to hold off the Australians long enough to be evacuated. This information was not known by the Allies, however, who were in fact expecting the Japanese to undertake further offensive action. In this regard, the 2/9th, initially with orders to join the 2/12th's counterattack, was delayed an extra day after an erroneous intelligence report from MacArthur's headquarters warning Clowes of a renewed Japanese attack forced him to briefly adopt a more defensive posture. The attack did not occur and, as a result, on 2 September the 2/9th was moved by barge up to the KB Mission. The next day it took over from the 2/12th and led the Australian advance. With the Japanese position at Milne Bay close to collapse, on 2 September Yano sent a radio message to the headquarters of the 8th Fleet which stated: "[w]e have reached the worst possible situation. We will together calmly defend our position to the death. We pray for absolute victory for the empire and for long-lasting fortune in battle for you all".

"Lying across the [air]strip were dozens of dead Japs... As our officer crossed in the vanguard a Jap, apparently wounded, cried out for help. The officer walked over to aid him, and as he did the Jap sprang to life and hurled a grenade which wounded him in the face. From then on the only good Jap was a dead one, and although they tried the same trick again and again throughout the campaign, they were dispatched before they had time to use their grenade.

"Our policy was to watch any apparent dead, shoot at the slightest sign of life and stab with bayonet even the ones who appeared to be rotten. It was all out from then on, neither side showing any quarter and no prisoners were taken."

— Sergeant Arthur Traill, 2/12th Infantry Battalion, Australian Army.

The terrain in this part of the bay offered significant advantage to defending forces, lined as it was with numerous creeks which slowed movement and obscured firing lanes. Throughout 3 September, the 2/9th Infantry Battalion came up against significant resistance; in one engagement that took place around mid-morning along a stream to the west of Elevada Creek they lost 34 men killed or wounded as they attempted to force their way across a creek. Engaged with sustained machine gun fire, the two assault platoons withdrew back across the creek while elements of another company that was in support moved to the northern flank. Launching their assault, they found that the Japanese had withdrawn, leaving about 20 of their dead.

Following this, the 2/9th advanced a further 500 metres (500 yd), reaching Sanderson's Bay, before deciding to set up their night location. That night Japanese ships again shelled Australian positions on the north shore of the bay, but without causing any casualties among the defenders.

On 4 September, the Australian advance continued as the 2/9th moved up the coast either side of the coastal track. After about one hour, the advance company struck a Japanese defensive position at Goroni. Throughout the day the Australians worked to outflank the position before launching an attack at 3:15 pm. During this action, one of the 2/9th's sections was held up by fire from three Japanese machine gun positions. Corporal John French ordered the other members of the section to take cover before he attacked and destroyed two of the machine guns with grenades. French then attacked the third position with his Thompson submachine gun. The Japanese firing ceased and the Australian section advanced to find that the machine gunners had been killed and that French had been mortally wounded in front of the third position. Despite his wounds he was conscious and could talk and was aware of what he had done. He was posthumously awarded the Victoria Cross for his "cool courage and disregard of his own personal safety" which "saved members of his section from heavy casualties and was responsible for the successful conclusion of the attack". By the end of the 4th, the Japanese force included only 50 fully fit soldiers; all the other surviving troops were either incapacitated or could only offer token resistance. In addition, the commanders of all the Japanese companies had been killed and only three or four platoon leaders remained.

=== Japanese withdrawal ===
Following the fighting on 31 August, the Japanese forces ashore had reported the situation to their headquarters at Rabaul. In response, plans were made to send the Aoba Detachment, which comprised the Army's 4th Infantry Regiment and an artillery company, to Rabi to complete the capture of the airfield. However, they were not scheduled to arrive until 11 September and so it was planned in the meantime to reinforce Yano's men with 130 men from the 5th Yokosuka SNLF. An abortive attempt was made to land these troops on 2 September and then again on 4 September. By that time, however, as further reports were received by the Japanese headquarters, it became apparent that Yano's troops would not be able to hold out until the Aoba Detachment could arrive. As a result, on 5 September, the Japanese high command ordered a withdrawal. This was carried out from the sea that evening.

Meanwhile, six Beauforts of No. 100 Squadron RAAF had arrived at Milne Bay on 5 September. An additional three Beaufighters of No. 30 Squadron RAAF, the first to operate this aircraft, joined them the following day. The Beauforts were tasked with providing additional support against further landings and undertaking anti-shipping missions. On 6 September, the Allied offensive reached the main camp of the Japanese landing force, fighting a number of minor actions against small groups that had been left behind after the evacuation.

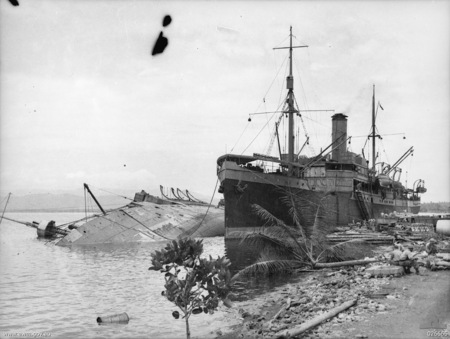
Anshun lying on her side in Milne Bay, New Guinea, 1942

Shortly after ten on the evening of 6 September, as the freighter Anshun was continuing unloading cargo under her lights, the port came under fire from the Japanese cruiser Tenryū and the destroyer Arashi with Anshun receiving about ten hits from the cruiser and rolling onto her side. The Japanese ships also shelled shore positions at Gili Gili and Waga Waga and illuminated, but did not fire on, the hospital ship Manunda which was displaying her hospital ship colours and lights. The next night, two Japanese warships – a cruiser and a destroyer – bombarded Australian positions causing a number of casualties for 15 minutes before leaving the bay; it would be their final act in the battle. During the mopping up operations that followed, patrols by Australian troops tracked down and killed a number of Japanese troops who were attempting to trek overland to Buna.

The 350 Japanese troops who had been stranded on Goodenough Island after their barges were destroyed on 24 August were not rescued until late October. An attempt to evacuate the force on 11 September ended in failure when the two destroyers assigned to this mission were attacked by USAAF aircraft, resulting in the loss of Yayoi. Two further attempts to rescue the force on 13 and 22 September were unsuccessful, though supplies were air-dropped on Goodenough Island. A submarine landed further supplies and evacuated 50 sick personnel on 3 and 13 October. As part of the preparations for the attack on Buna and Gona, the 2/12th Infantry Battalion was assigned responsibility for securing Goodenough Island on 19 October. The battalion landed on the island three days later. A series of small engagements on 23 and 24 October cost the Australian force 13 killed and 19 wounded, and the Japanese suffered 20 killed and 15 wounded. The remaining Japanese troops were evacuated by two barges to nearby Fergusson Island on the night of 24 October, and the light cruiser Tenryū rescued them two days later. After securing the island, the 2/12th began work on building Vivigani Airfield on its east coast.

== Aftermath ==
=== Base development ===
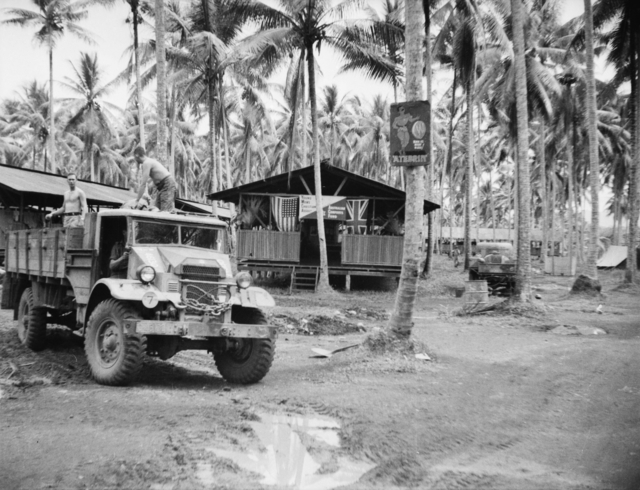
The recreation hut at the Reception and General Details Depot, Milne Bay Sub Area, in 1944

The Allies continued to develop the base area at Milne Bay in support of the counter-offensive along the northern coast of Papua and New Guinea. The American base became US Advanced Sub Base A on 21 April 1943, US Advance Base A on 14 August and US Base A on 15 November. Its Australian counterpart, the Milne Bay Base Sub Area, was formed on 14 June 1943. Two 155-millimetre (6.1 in) coastal guns with searchlights were provided to protect the base from naval threats. New roads were built and the existing ones upgraded to make them passable in the wet conditions. A meteorological record was set on 29 April 1944, when 610 millimetres (24 in) of rain fell in a 24-hour period. By June 1944, there was over 160 kilometres (100 mi) of road in the area.

A bitumen-surfaced second runway was built at No. 1 Airstrip by No. 6 Mobile Works Squadron RAAF, after which the original runway was only used for emergencies and taxiing. The minefield around No. 3 Airstrip was lifted and the airstrip was completed, with revetments and hardstands for 70 medium bombers. A new wharf, known as Liles' wharf after the American engineer who supervised its construction, was built in September and October 1942. This was capable of handling Liberty ships. Henceforth ships could sail direct to Milne Bay from the United States, reducing the pressure on Australian ports and saving two or three days' sailing time in addition to the time formerly taken to unload and then reload the cargo on smaller ships in those ports. PT boats were based at Milne Bay from December 1942, with PT boat overhaul facilities, a destroyer base, a transshipment and staging area and a Station Hospital also constructed.

On 14 April 1943, the Allied base was attacked by 188 Japanese aircraft during the Japanese air offensive, Operation I-Go. The base's anti-aircraft defences were limited, but a force of 24 RAAF Kittyhawk fighters were on hand to respond to the attack. Minor damage was inflicted on the supply dumps around the airfields, while one British motorship, Gorgon, was damaged and Van Heemskerk, a Dutch transport carrying US troops, was sunk. At least three Allied aircraft were shot down, while the Japanese lost seven aircraft. Later, Milne Bay was used as a staging area for mounting the landing at Lae in September 1943, and the New Britain Campaign in December. The base at Milne Bay remained operational until the end of the war.

=== War crimes ===
During the Australian counterattack, the advancing troops found evidence that the Japanese had committed a number of war crimes at Milne Bay, specifically the execution of prisoners of war (POWs) and civilians. None of the 36 Australian troops who were captured by the Japanese survived; a number of them were found to have been executed with some showing signs of having been mutilated as well. In addition, at least 59 civilians were also murdered between 25 August and 6 September; included in this were a number of Papuan women who were sexually assaulted before being killed. The war crimes committed at Milne Bay hardened Australian soldiers' attitudes towards Japanese troops for the remainder of the war. Historian Mark Johnston has written that "the Australians' relentless killing of Japanese then and thereafter owed much to a determination both to retaliate in kind and to take revenge for Japanese atrocities and rumoured maltreatment of POWs".

Later, the Australian Minister for External Affairs, Dr. H. V. Evatt, commissioned a report by William Webb on war crimes committed by the Japanese. Webb took depositions about the Milne Bay incident from members of the Allied forces who had been present, and used them to form part of his report. In 1944 this was submitted to the United Nations War Crimes Commission, which had been set up by the Allies following the Moscow Declaration. Evidence about the crimes was presented to the Tokyo War Crimes Tribunal on 2 January 1947, but no Japanese personnel were prosecuted for actions during the fighting at Milne Bay.

=== Results ===
The Australians estimated Japanese casualties to be around 700 to 750 killed in action, and a Japanese source reported 625 killed in action. Of the 1,943 Japanese soldiers that were landed at Milne Bay, ships from the Japanese 18th Cruiser Division managed to evacuate 1,318 personnel, including 311 who were wounded. The Australians suffered 373 casualties, of which 167 were killed or missing in action. US forces lost 14 personnel killed and several wounded.

Although Allied casualties during the battle had been light, in the wake of the battle, Milne Bay suffered an epidemic of malaria that posed a threat to the base as great as that from the Japanese attack. Over one-sixth of Milne Force, including Clowes, came down with the disease. The incidence of malaria soared to 33 per thousand per week in September (equivalent to 1,716 per thousand per annum), and to 82 per thousand per week in December (equivalent to 4,294 per thousand per annum). At this rate, the whole force could have been incapacitated in a matter of months. It placed enormous strain on the medical units and the supplies of anti-malarial drugs. The Chief Pathologist of New Guinea Force, Lieutenant Colonel Edward Ford, went to see Blamey, who was now in personal command of New Guinea Force, and told him that 1,000 men and a large quantity of anti-malarial supplies were urgently required at Milne Bay to avert a disaster. Blamey took a personal interest in the matter. He expedited supply shipments, and made the required personnel available. The arrival of quantities of the new drug atabrine allowed this more effective drug to be substituted for quinine. The incidence of malaria dropped dramatically after December, the month in which atabrine became the official Australian prophylactic drug, and by March 1943 the crisis had passed. After this, the incidence of malaria amongst the garrison at Milne Bay was similar to other bases in Papua and New Guinea.

Strategically, as a result of the fighting around Milne Bay, Japanese operations within the region were constrained. The defeat at Milne Bay kept them from bypassing the holding action that the Australians were conducting on the Kokoda Track. Milne Bay showed the limits of Japanese capability to expand using relatively small forces in the face of increasingly larger Allied troop concentrations and command of the air. The Japanese commanders were then forced to change their plans in the region, shifting their focus towards repelling the US forces that had landed on Guadalcanal, while maintaining a smaller effort around Buna–Gona, under Major General Tomitarō Horii. Once they had retaken Guadalcanal, they planned to reinforce Horii's forces and launch a reinvigorated attack on the Australians around Port Moresby. In the end, subsequent defeats at Buna–Gona and on Guadalcanal did not allow them to implement these plans, as the Allies gained the ascendency in the region throughout late 1942 and the Japanese were forced to fall back to the northern coast of New Guinea. In the aftermath of the battle, a large amount of intelligence was also gained by the Allies, providing their planners with a better understanding of the strengths and weaknesses of the Japanese and their equipment. It also demonstrated that the Militia were an effective fighting force.

The most significant result, though, was the effect that the victory had on the morale of Allied servicemen elsewhere in Asia and the Pacific, especially those on the Kokoda Track, and British troops fighting in Burma. Although the Japanese had previously suffered minor local defeats, such as those around Changsha in China, as well as the first landing at Wake Island and the Battle of the Tenaru on Guadalcanal, these actions, unlike Milne Bay, had not resulted in complete Japanese withdrawal and the abandonment of the military campaign. The Allied victory at Milne Bay therefore represented the first "full-scale defeat [of the Japanese] on land".

"We were helped, too, by a very cheering piece of news that now reached us, and of which, as a morale raiser, I made great use. Australian troops had, at Milne Bay in New Guinea, inflicted on the Japanese their first undoubted defeat on land. If the Australians, in conditions very like ours, had done it, so could we. Some of us may forget that of all the Allies it was the Australian soldiers who first broke the spell of the invincibility of the Japanese Army; those of us who were in Burma have cause to remember."

— British Field Marshal Sir William Slim.

In Australia, initial public reaction to the victory at the time was one of cautious optimism. An article in The Canberra Times from early September 1942 labelled the victory a "tonic surprise", and while highlighting the example as a portent of future battlefield success by Australian forces in the region, also pointed out the task that lay ahead of the Australians in New Guinea remained a "major problem". Most significantly, though, it highlighted the importance of morale in turning the tide in the war, describing it as "the bridge that must carry all the vast and complicated effort being directed towards victory". Another article, which appeared in The West Australian at the same time, while also preparing the Australian public for the tough fighting that would follow in New Guinea, hailed the victory at Milne Bay as a "turning point", the instance of which signalled an end of a "rearguard campaign" and the start of an Allied offensive in the region.

Amongst individual Australian soldiers, the news of the victory helped to dispel some of the notions about the invincibility of the Japanese soldier that had developed in the psyche of Allied soldiers following the defeats of early 1942, and which had impacted on Allied planning up to that point. Some of these notions would remain until the end of the war, but the news of Milne Bay allowed some soldiers to rationalise the Japanese soldiers' past victories as being the result of tangible factors, such as numerical superiority, that could be overcome, rather than innate factors associated with the intangible qualities of the Japanese soldier that were not so easily overcome. After this, amongst the Allies there was "a sense that fortune's wheel was turning", and although leaders such as Blamey emphasised the difficulties that lay ahead, a feeling of confidence in eventual victory emerged. MacArthur warned the War Department that success was attributable to good intelligence that allowed him to concentrate a superior force at Milne Bay, and might not be repeatable.

After the war, the Australian Army commemorated the battle through the awarding of a battle honour titled "Milne Bay" to a number of the units that took part. The units chosen were the 9th, 25th, 61st, 2/9th, 2/10th and 2/12th Infantry Battalions. The two RAAF fighter squadrons that had taken part in the fighting were also singled out for praise by the Australian commanders for their role in the battle. Rowell stated: "the action of 75 and 76 Squadrons RAAF on the first day was probably the decisive factor", a view Clowes endorsed in his own report.

== See also ==
- Battle of Milne Bay order of battle
