= Minoru Yano =

Japanese officer

- 矢野 実
- Military career
- Allegiance: Empire of Japan
- Branch: Imperial Japanese Navy
- Rank: Commander
- Conflicts: World War II; Battle of Milne Bay (WIA)

Minoru Yano (矢野 実, Yano Minoru) was an officer in the Imperial Japanese Navy during World War II. He was a member of the 51st Class of the Imperial Japanese Naval Academy, ranking 185 of 255 Cadets. He took overall command of forces during the Battle of Milne Bay from Shojiro Hayashi and "was seriously wounded" during the battle.

== Battle of Milne Bay ==
On the 29th of August 1942 Yano led a landing party of 769 naval troops, from the Kure 3d Special Naval Landing Force and Yokosuka 5th Special Naval Landing Force, to support an earlier landing force commanded by Comdr. Shojiro Hayashi, which had been blocked by allied defences.

While the mood of the Japanese troops was, at first, optimistic, this changed when they became the target of sustained allied fire over a number of days. Eventually the Japanese forces were evacuated on September 5, having lost 625 of the original 1943 troops who had landed.

== Known assignments ==
- Division Officer, Notoro - ??? - 26 May 1930
- Gunnery Officer, Nenohi - 20 June 1934 - 10 November 1936
- Gunnery Officer, Tatsuta - 10 November 1936 - 1 December 1937
- Gunnery Officer, Tokiwa - 1 December 1937 - 1 June 1938
- Gunnery Officer, Chiyoda - 1 November 1939 - 15 October 1940
- Commanding Officer, 3rd Kure Naval District Special Naval Landing Force (SNLF) - 1 February 1942 - 1 November 1942
- Reserve Status - 1 November 1943

== Promotions ==
- Midshipman - 14 July 1923
- Ensign - 1 December 1924
- Sub-Lieutenant - 1 December 1926
- Lieutenant - 30 November 1929
- Lieutenant Commander - 1 December 1936
- Commander - 15 October 1941
