= Japanese cruiser Tenryū =

Light naval cruiser (1919–1942)

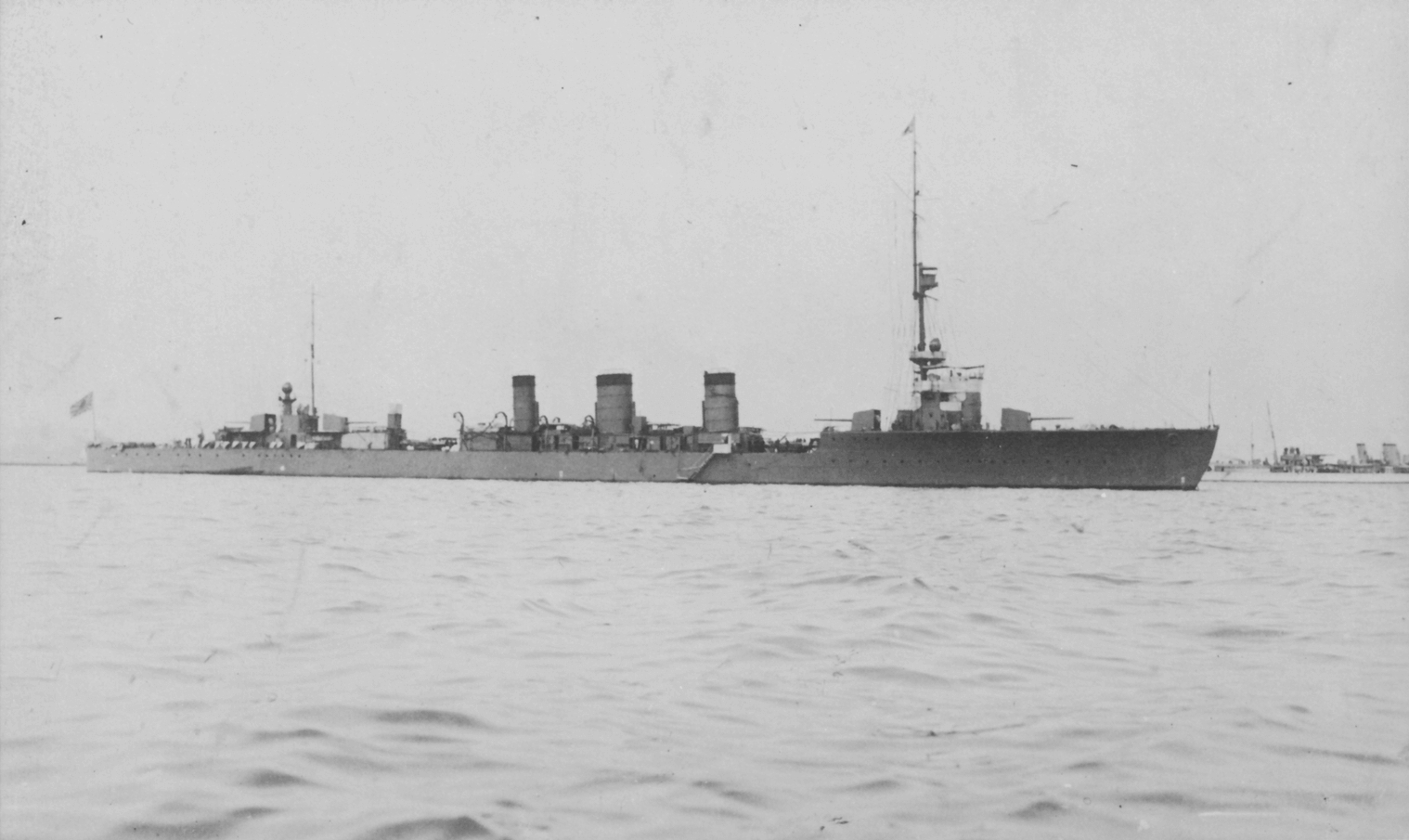
- Tenryū in Yokosuka, 1925

History

Empire of Japan
- Name: Tenryū
- Namesake: Tenryū River
- Ordered: 1915 Fiscal Year
- Builder: Yokosuka Naval Arsenal
- Laid down: 7 May 1917
- Launched: 11 March 1918
- Commissioned: 20 November 1919
- Stricken: 20 January 1943
- Fate: Sunk 19 December 1942 off Madang, New Guinea

General characteristics
- Class & type: Tenryū-class cruiser
- Displacement: 3,948 long tons (4,011 t) (standard); 4,350 long tons (4,420 t) (full load)
- Length: 142.9 m (468 ft 10 in) o/a
- Beam: 12.3 m (40 ft 4 in)
- Draft: 4 m (13 ft 1 in)
- Installed power: 51,000 shp (38,000 kW)
- Propulsion: 3 × Brown-Curtis geared steam turbines; 10 × Kampon boilers; 3 × shafts; 920 tons oil, 150 tons coal
- Speed: 33 knots (61 km/h; 38 mph)
- Range: 5,000 nmi (9,300 km; 5,800 mi) at 14 kn (26 km/h; 16 mph)
- Complement: 327
- Armament: 4 × 14 cm/50 3rd Year Type naval guns; 1 × 8 cm/40 3rd Year Type naval guns; 2 × Type 93 13.2 mm (0.52 in) anti-aircraft machine guns; 6 × 533 mm (21.0 in) torpedo tubes
- Armor: Belt: 63 mm (2.5 in); Deck: 25 mm (1 in); Conning tower: 51 mm (2 in)

Tenryū (天龍; Heavenly Dragon) was the lead ship in the two-ship Tenryū class of light cruisers of the Imperial Japanese Navy. Tenryū was named after the Tenryū River in Nagano and Shizuoka prefectures.

== Background ==
The Tenryū-class was designed to act as flagships for destroyer flotillas. The design represented an intermediate class between the light cruiser and the destroyer, which had few counterparts in other navies of the time, although it was inspired by a similar concept to the Royal Navy's Arethusa and C-class cruisers. The Imperial Japanese Navy and Japanese shipbuilding industry were still closely associated with the British due to the Anglo-Japanese Alliance, and were able to improve on the British experience.

== Design ==
The Tenryū-class vessels, termed "small-model" (or "3,500-Ton") cruisers, were designed as fast flotilla leaders for the Imperial Navy's new first- and second-class destroyers. With improvements in oil-fired turbine engine technology and the use of Brown Curtiss geared turbine engines, the Tenryū class had more than twice the horsepower of the previous Chikuma class, and were capable of the high speed of 33 knots (61 km/h; 38 mph), which was deemed necessary in their role as flagships for destroyer squadrons. However, by the time of their completion, newer Japanese destroyers, such as the Minekaze class had a design speed of 39 knots, and newer American cruisers, such as the Omaha class also exceeded it in firepower.

However, in terms of weaponry, the Tenryū class was weaker than any other contemporary cruiser. The main battery consisted of four 14 cm/50 3rd Year Type naval guns, which were also utilized as the secondary battery on the Ise-class battleships. However, the guns were situated in single mounts on the centerline, with only a limited angle of fire, and could fire only one gun at a target immediately in front or aft of the vessel. A further weakness was the lack of room for anti-aircraft guns. Despite awareness increasing about the growing threat of aircraft to surface ships, the secondary battery of the Tenryū class consisted of only a single dual-purpose 8 cm/40 3rd Year Type naval guns, plus two 6.5 mm machine guns. The class also was the first to use triple torpedo launchers, with two centerline-mounted Type 6 21-inch launchers. No reloads were carried.

== Service history ==
=== Early career ===
Tenryū was completed on 20 November 1919, at the Yokosuka Naval Arsenal, and was assigned as flagship of the 2nd Destroyer Squadron based at Kure Naval District, under the IJN 2nd Fleet.

The following year, Tenryū was assigned to patrols of the east coast of Russia, providing support to Japanese troops in the Siberian Intervention against the Bolshevik Red Army. She was transferred to the reserves at Kure on 20 April, but was reactivated from 1 December 1921 - 1 December 1922, and again from 1 December 1923 – 1 December 1925, alternating active duty periods with her sister ship Tatsuta as flagship of the 1st Destroyer Squadron. From 5 February 1927, she was assigned to patrols of the mouth of the Yangtze River.

After minor renovation in late 1927, Tenryū once again became flagship of the 1st Destroyer Squadron. From 1 December 1928, she was assigned back to Kure, serving as a training vessel for the Imperial Japanese Navy Academy and Submarine School. In 1930, she was given a tripod foremast.

On 9 October 1931, Tenryū was assigned to patrols of the Yangtze River in China as part of the IJN 3rd Fleet, and was thus in combat during the January 28 Incident at Shanghai in 1932. She returned to Japan in October 1933, and from November 1934 was again based at Kure. On 26 September 1935, during fleet maneuvers in a typhoon, Tatsuta (along with several other vessels) suffered hull damage in what later came to be known as the Fourth Fleet Incident. Repair work at Kure Naval Arsenal lasted until May 1936.

From November 1936, Tenryū was paired with her sister ship Tatsuta in the 10th Cruiser Squadron of the IJN 3rd Fleet, replacing the cruiser Kuma. As the situation between Japan and China deteriorated into the Second Sino-Japanese War, Tenryū supported the landings of the Imperial Japanese Army and Japanese naval forces in Shanghai, and the blockade of the Chinese coast. As a component of the IJN 5th Fleet, on 10 May 1938 she covered the landing of Japanese forces at Amoy and on 1 July 1938 supported operations in Guangzhou. Tatsuta and Tenryū operated in Chinese waters until 14 December 1938, when they were withdrawn from front line service and assigned to the reserves. From 1 December 1939, Tenryū was based at Maizuru Naval District as a guard ship and training vessel for the Imperial Japanese Navy Engineering Academy.

However, from 15 November 1940, in preparation for the upcoming hostilities with the United States, Tenryū and Tatsuta were extensively modernized and renovated. Their coal/oil boilers were replaced with oil-fired boilers and a steel roof replaced the former canvas covering of the bridge. The two Type 93 13.2 mm (0.52 in) AA machine guns (which had been added in 1937) were replaced with two twin-mount Type 96 25 mm AA guns.

=== Early Pacific War ===
From 12 September 1941, Tatsuta and Tenryū were redeployed to Truk, in the Caroline Islands, as CruDiv 18 of the Fourth Fleet. At the time of the attack on Pearl Harbor, CruDiv 18 had deployed from Kwajalein as part of the Wake Island invasion force. Tenryū bombarded shore installations during the first Battle of Wake Island, and also participated in the second (successful) invasion attempt on Wake Island on 21 December.

On 20 January 1942, Tatsuta and Tenryū were assigned to cover troop transports during the invasion of Kavieng, New Ireland and Gasmata, New Britain from 3–9 February, and patrolled from Truk in late February.

During a refit at Truk on 23 February, two additional Type 96 twin-mount 25 mm AA guns were installed aft, as part of the heightened awareness of the threat posed by American aircraft.

=== Solomon Islands and New Guinea campaigns ===
From March, Tenryū with CruDiv 18 covered numerous troop landings throughout the Solomon Islands and New Guinea, including Lae and Salamaua, Buka, Bougainville, Rabaul, Shortland, and Kieta, and Manus Island, Admiralty Islands, and Tulagi returning to Truk on 10 April.

Tatsuta and Tenryū were both assigned to the aborted "Operation Mo" (the occupation of Port Moresby, and covered the establishment of a seaplane base at Rekata Bay at Santa Isabel Island from 3–5 May. The operation was cancelled following the Battle of the Coral Sea, and Tatsuta was recalled to Maizuru Naval Arsenal in Japan for repairs on 24 May, remaining for a month. On 23 June, she returned to Truk. Tatsuta and Tenryū escorted a convoy to Guadalcanal on 6 July, which contained an engineering battalion assigned to build an airstrip.

On 14 July 1942, in a major reorganization of the Japanese navy, CruDiv 18 under Rear Admiral Mitsuharu Matsuyama came under the newly created Eighth Fleet, commanded by Vice Admiral Gunichi Mikawa and based at Rabaul. On 20 July, Tenryū was assigned to cover Japanese troop landings in the invasion of Buna, New Guinea ("Operation RI"). The invasion force was attacked by United States Army Air Forces Boeing B-17 Flying Fortress and Martin B-26 Marauder bombers on its return to Rabaul, but Tenryū was unharmed.

=== Battle of Savo Island ===
On 9 August 1942, Tenryū was in the Battle of Savo Island, together with the cruisers Yūbari, Aoba, Kako, Kinugasa, Furutaka, and Chōkai, and the destroyer Yūnagi, which attacked US Task Group 62.6 that was screening transports with Allied invasion forces for Guadalcanal. During nighttime gun and torpedo action, Tenryū sank the cruiser USS Quincy with two torpedoes. She also contributed to sinking the cruisers USS Astoria, Vincennes, and HMAS Canberra. In addition, the cruiser USS Chicago and destroyers USS Ralph Talbot and Patterson were damaged. Tenryū was hit by Chicago, with 23 crewmen killed. Tenryū remained based out of Rabaul through the end of August, escorting convoys of troops and supplies.,

On 25 August, Tenryū covered of the landing of 1,200 troops of the Kure No. 5 Special Naval Landing Force at Milne Bay, New Guinea ("Operation RE"), and on 6 September, was part of the force assigned to evacuate the surviving troops after their defeat, and in the process bombarded the Gili Gili wharves and sank the 3,199-ton British freighter Anshun.

On 2 October, Tenryū was hit by a bomb dropped by a B-17 of the 19th Bomb Group, Fifth Air Force while at Rabaul. The bomb killed 30 crewmen, but the ship was not severely damaged. Tenryū was then tasked with Tokyo Express transport runs from Rabaul to Tassafaronga, Guadalcanal, through early November, evacuating 190 members of the Sasebo No.5 Special Night Operations Landing Force on 26 October and narrowly escaping a torpedo launched by USS Plunger on 3 November off Santa Isabel Island. On 8 November, Tenryū was attacked by PT boats (PT-37, PT-39, and PT-61) off Cape Tassafaronga, but escaped without damage.

=== Naval Battles of Guadalcanal ===
On 13 November 1942, Tenryū departed Shortland for Guadalcanal as part of the Japanese task force for the bombardment of Henderson Field. The task force was attacked the next day by USS Flying Fish and Grumman TBF Avenger torpedo-bombers from USS Enterprise and Guadalcanal. During the subsequent battle, Kinugasa was sunk and Chōkai was slightly damaged. A Douglas SBD Dauntless dive bomber crashed into the cruiser Maya. Tenryū was undamaged and returned to Shortland.

On 16 December 1942, Tenryū departed for Madang, New Guinea, in an attack force with the destroyers Isonami, Inazuma, Suzukaze, and Arashio and the armed merchant cruisers Aikoku Maru and Gokoku Maru, successfully landing its forces on 18 December.

The following day, as Tenryū was departing, it was attacked by the submarine USS Albacore, which fired three torpedoes each at a transport and what it identified as a destroyer. The torpedoes missed the transport, but one hit Tenryū in the stern. Tenryū sank at 23:20 on 19 December 1942, at 05°12′S 145°56′E. Twenty-three crewmen were lost, but Suzukaze rescued the survivors, including Captain Mitsuharu Ueda.

Tenryū was struck from the navy list on 20 January 1943.

== Gallery ==
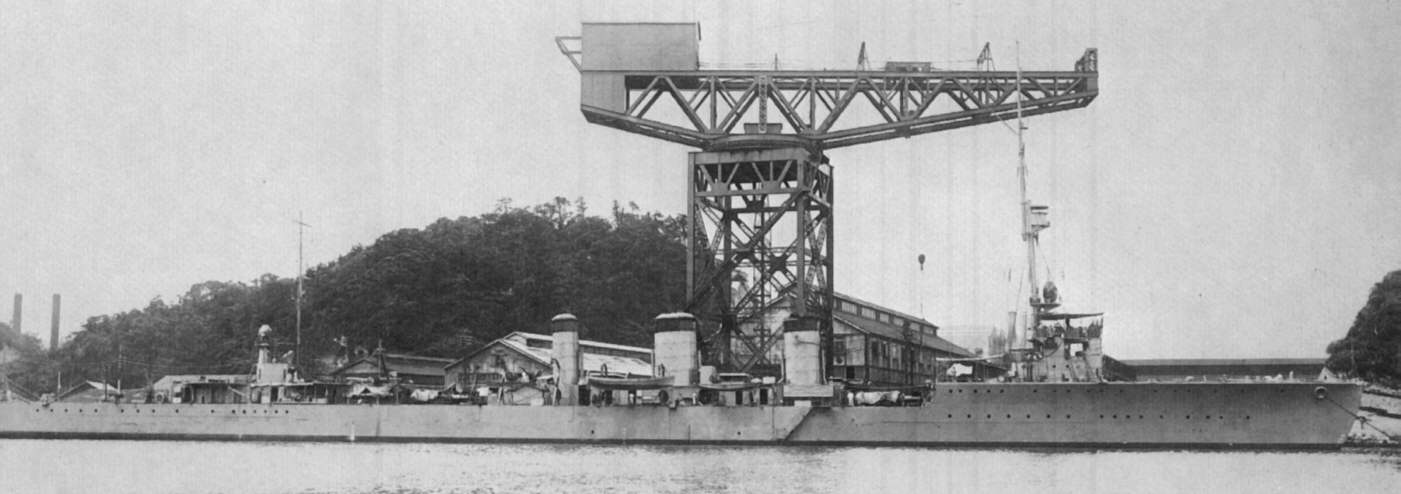
In 1919, under construction

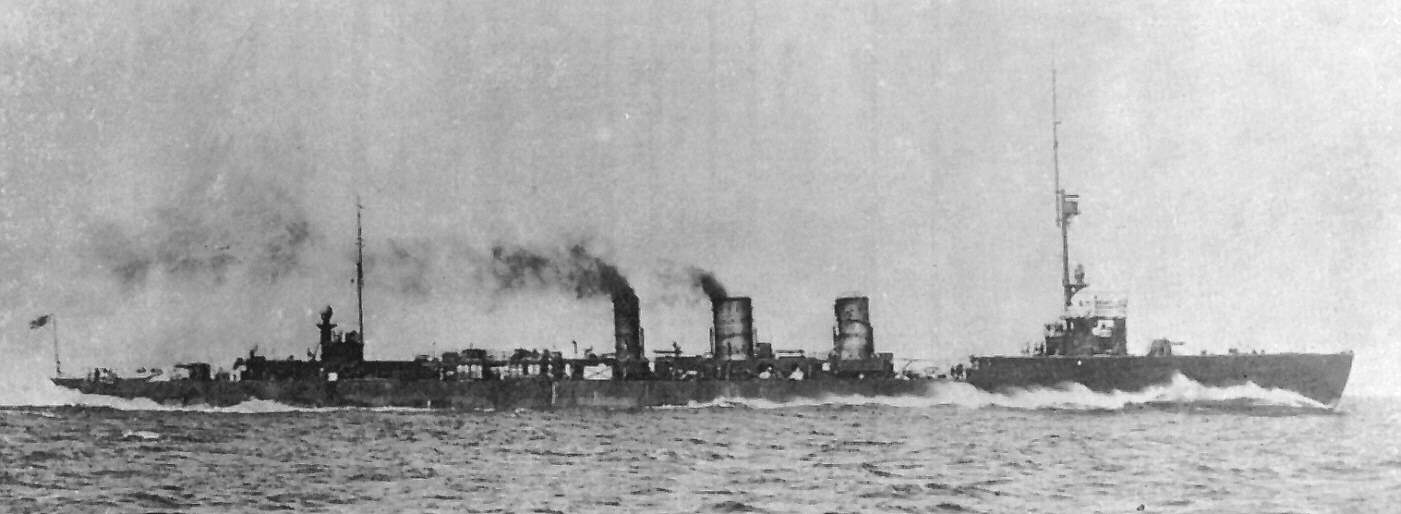
In 1919, under trials

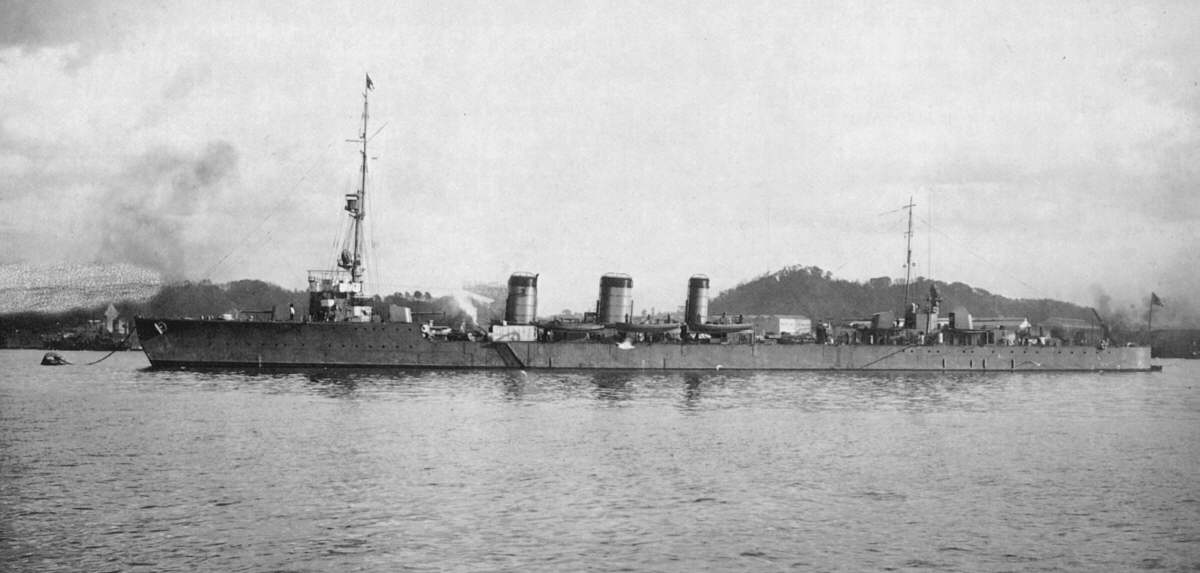
At Yokosuka, 1919

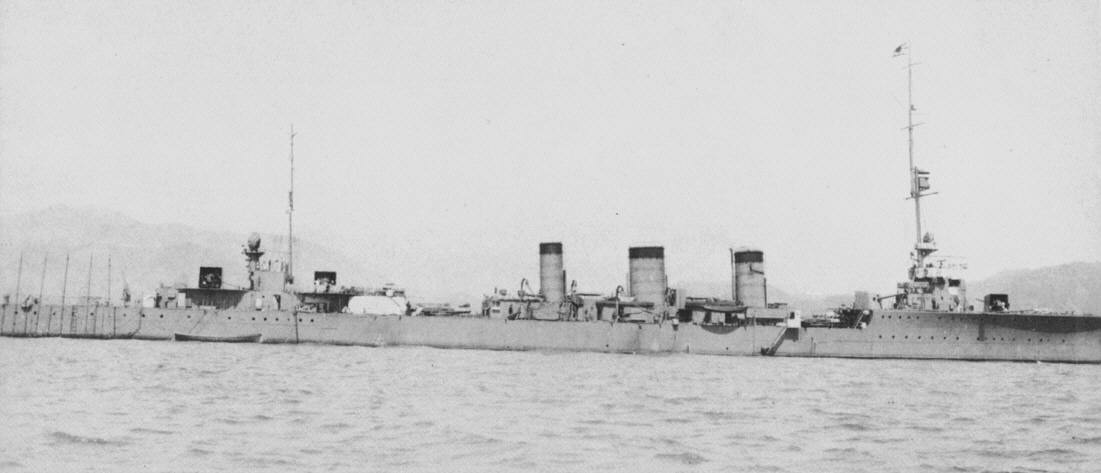
In 1921

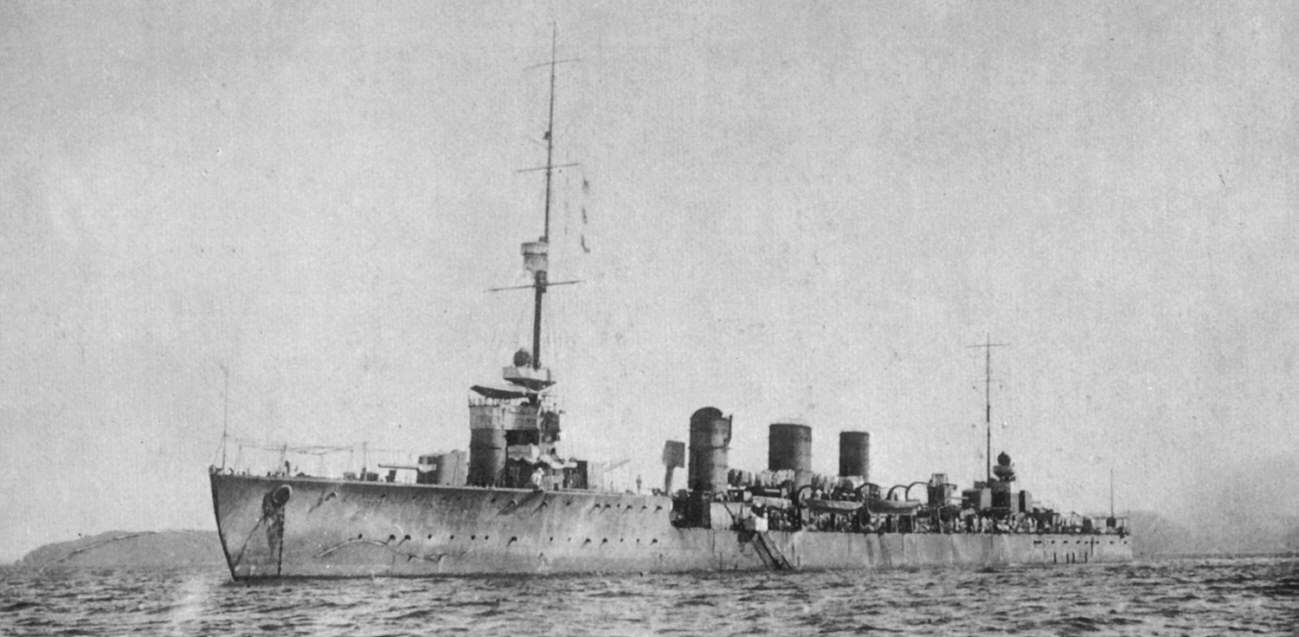
In the 1920s

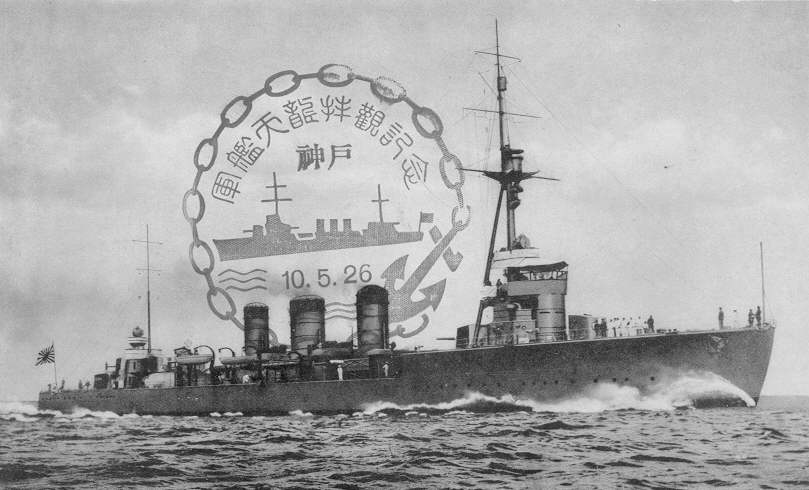
In a 1926 postcard

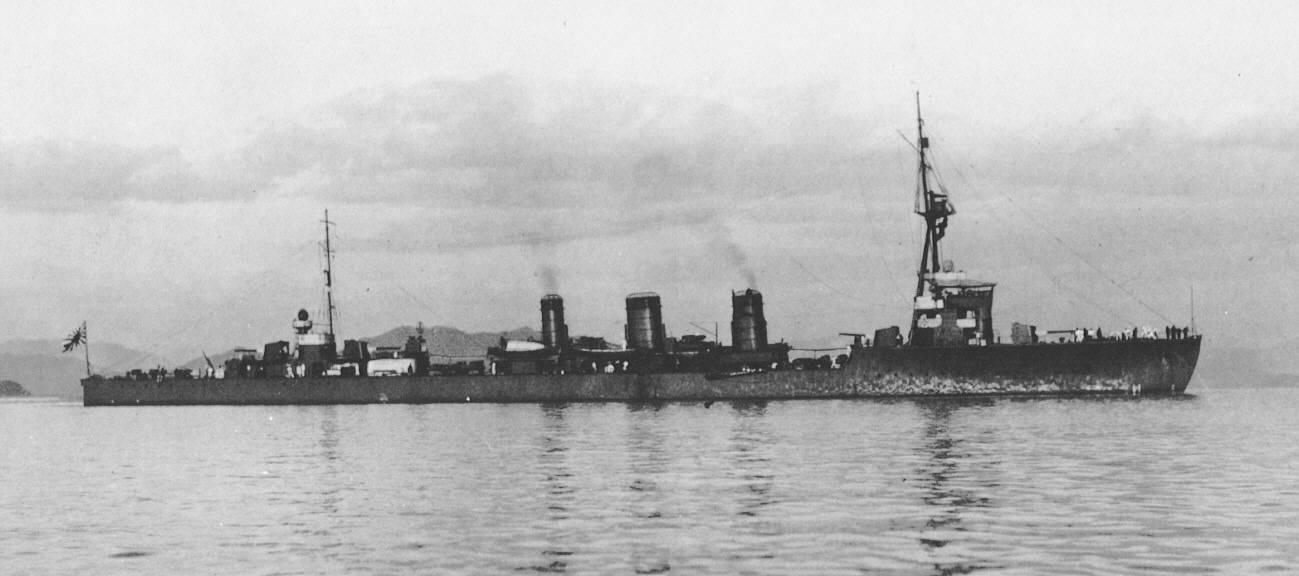
In 1930

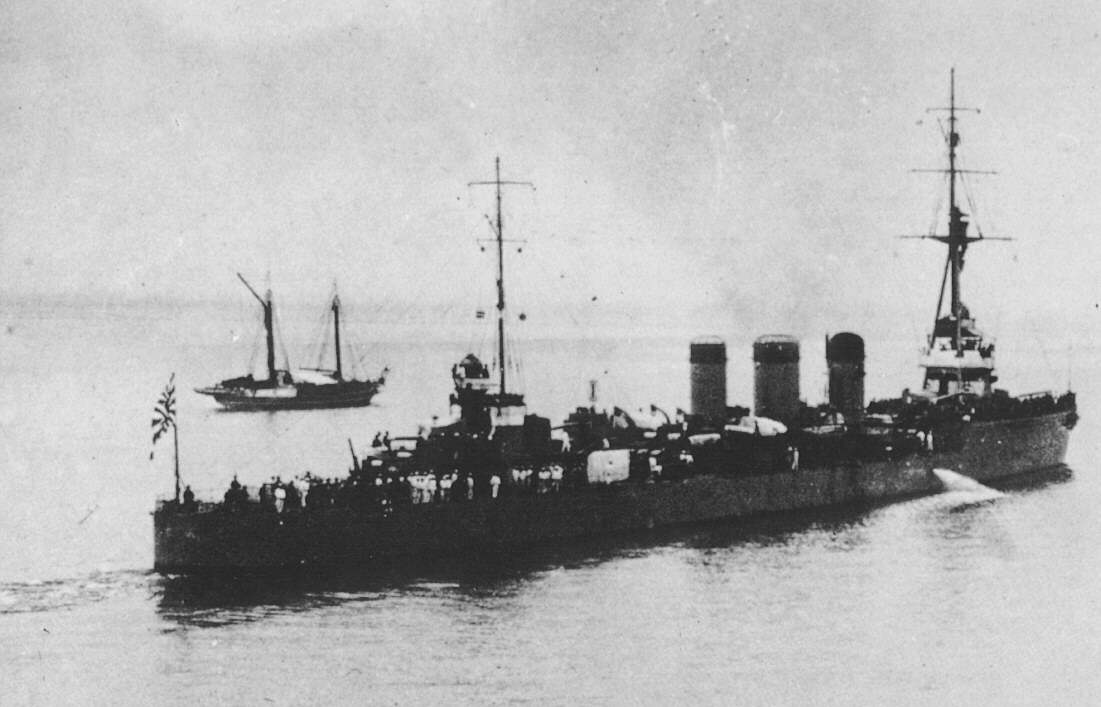
In the Inland Sea, 1930–1932

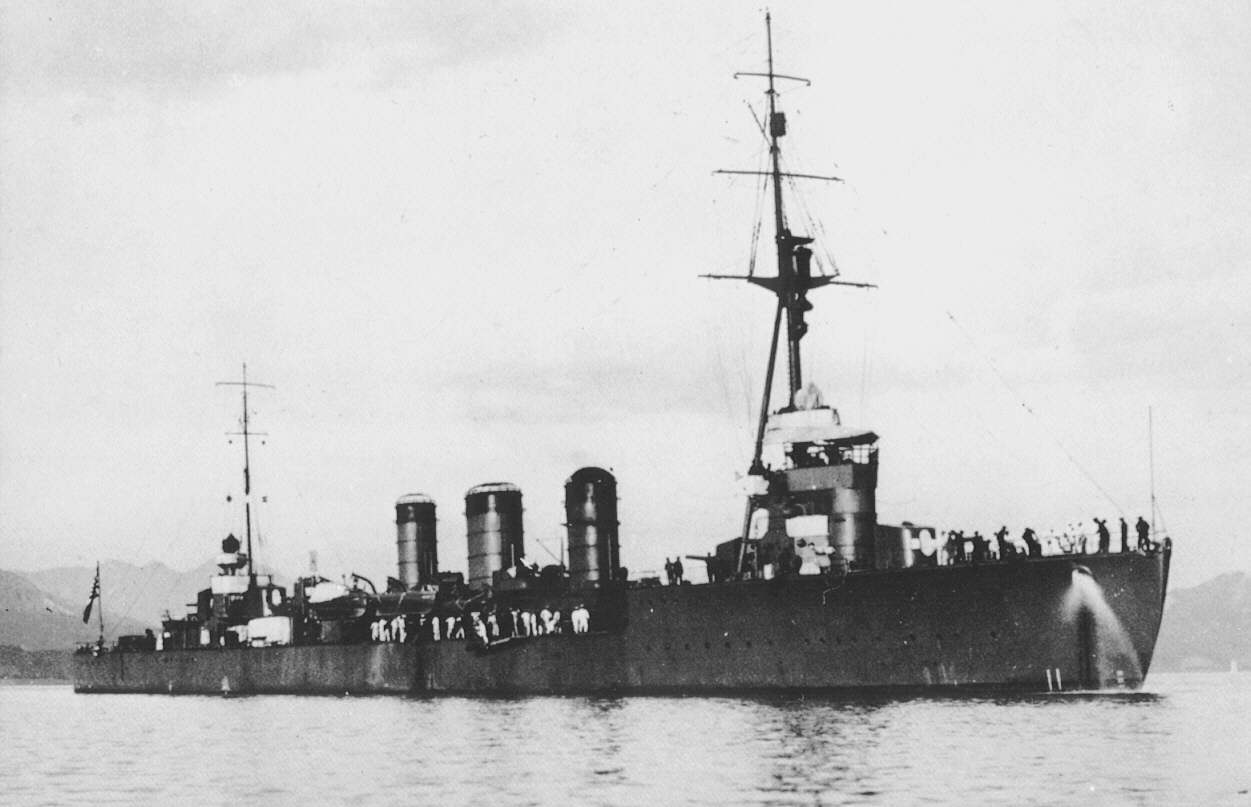
In 1930–1931

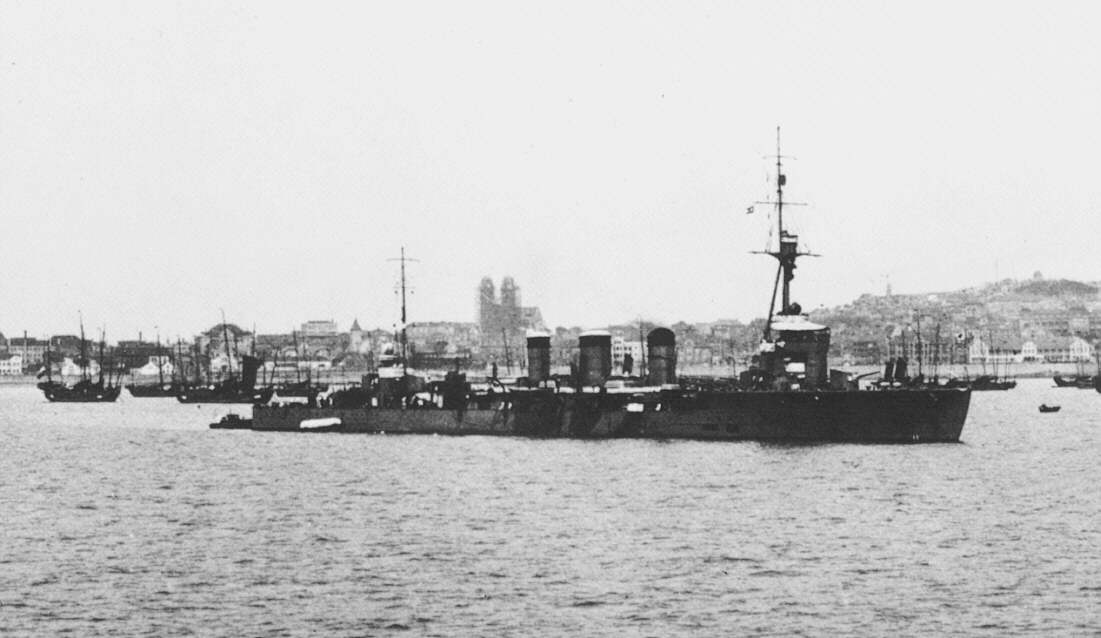
At Shanghai, 1932

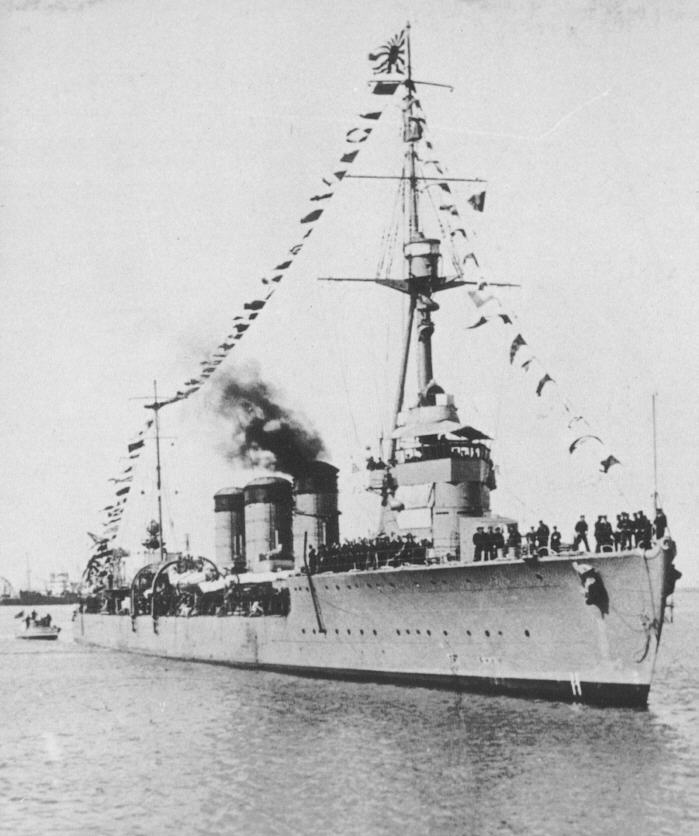
At Shanghai, February 1934

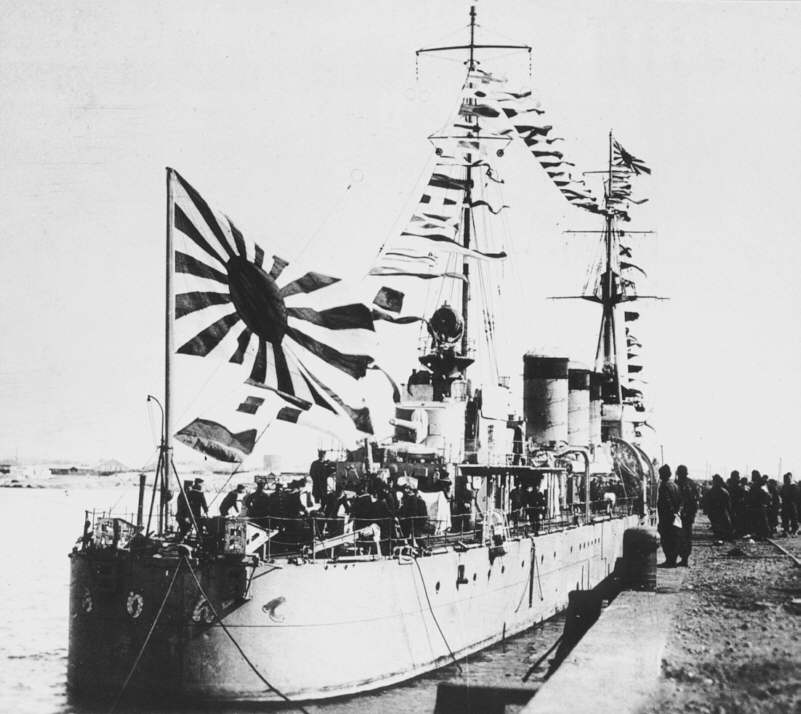
Docked at Shanghai, February 1934

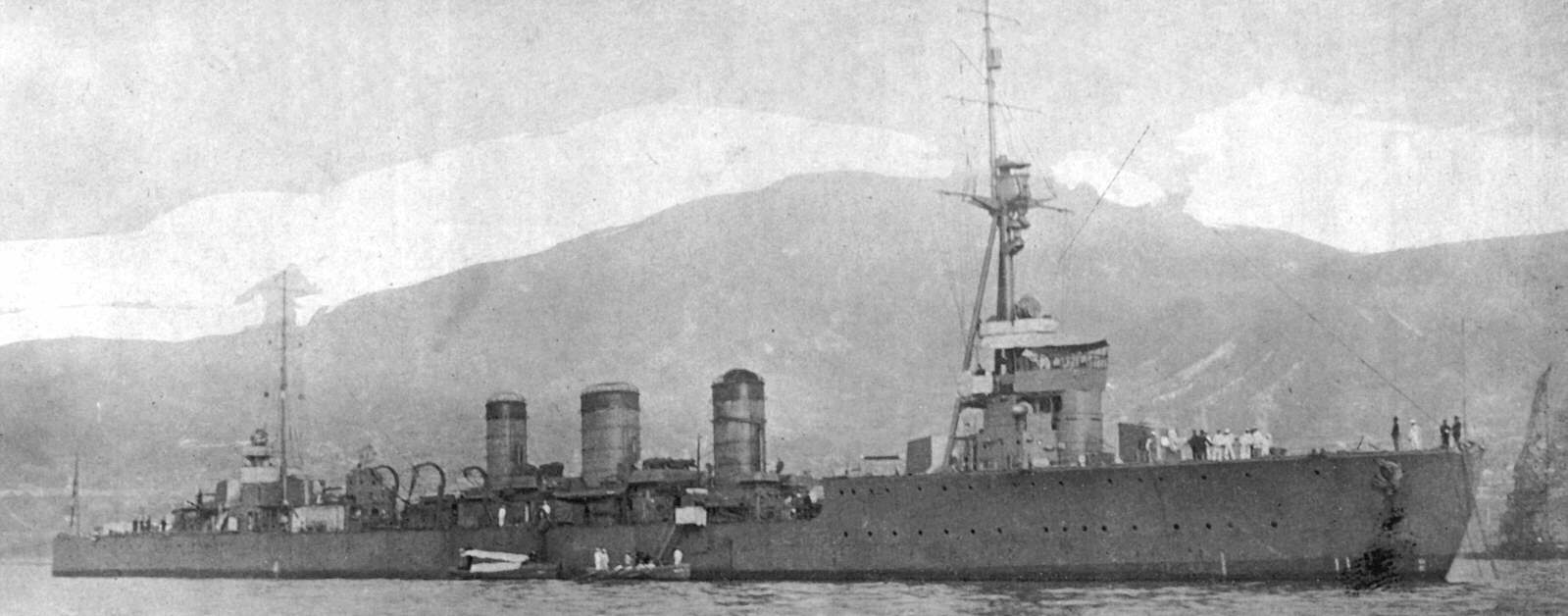
In 1936
