= Japanese submarine chaser CH-24 =

History

Empire of Japan
- Name: CH-24
- Builder: Osaka Iron Works
- Completed: 20 December 1941
- Fate: Sunk by the destroyer USS Burns, 17 February 1944

General characteristics
- Class & type: No.13-class submarine chaser
- Displacement: 438 long tons (445 t) standard
- Length: 51 m (167 ft 4 in) o/a
- Beam: 6.7 m (22 ft 0 in)
- Draught: 2.75 m (9 ft 0 in)
- Propulsion: 2 × Kampon Mk.23A Model 8 diesels, 2 shafts, 1,700 bhp (1,268 kW)
- Speed: 16 knots (30 km/h; 18 mph)
- Range: 2,000 nmi (3,700 km) at 14 kn (26 km/h; 16 mph)
- Complement: 68
- Sensors & processing systems: 1 × Type 93 active sonar; 1 × Type 93 hydrophone
- Armament: 1 × 76.2 mm (3.00 in) L/40 AA gun; 2 × Type 93 13.2 mm (0.52 in) AA guns; 36 × Type 95 depth charges; 2 × Type 94 depth charge projectors; 1 × depth charge thrower

The Japanese submarine chaser CH-24 was a No.13-class submarine chaser of the Imperial Japanese Navy during World War II. She was built by the Ōsaka Iron Works, Sakurajima and completed on 20 December 1941. On 24 August 1942, she left Rabaul as part of Operation RE, for the landings at Milne Bay. On March 15, 1943 she, along with CH-22 and Satsuki, sank a submarine, possibly USS Triton, north west of the Admiralty Islands.

== Fate ==
She was sunk during Operation Hailstone by the destroyer USS Burns west of Truk on 17 February 1944.
