= USS Plunger (SS-179) =

Submarine of the United States

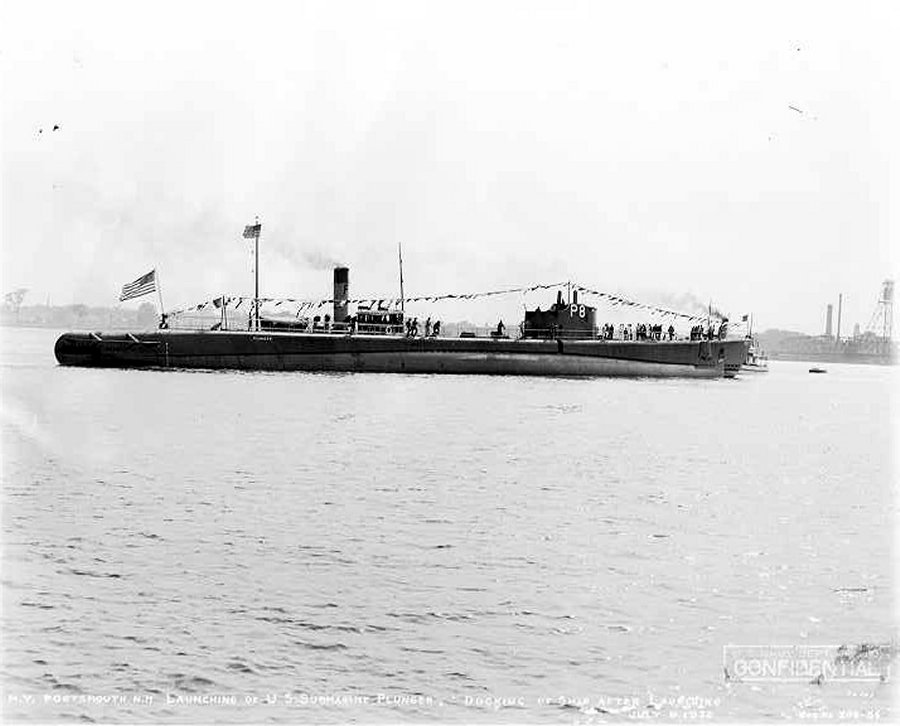
- Plunger (SS-179) is waterborne at Portsmouth Navy Yard, Kittery, Maine. 8 July 1936.

History

United States
- Name: USS Plunger
- Namesake: Plunger, a diver or daring gambler
- Builder: Portsmouth Naval Shipyard, Kittery, Maine
- Laid down: 17 July 1935
- Launched: 8 July 1936
- Sponsored by: Miss Edith E. Greenlee
- Commissioned: 19 November 1936
- Decommissioned: 15 November 1945
- Stricken: 6 July 1956
- Fate: Sold for breaking up, 22 April 1957

General characteristics
- Class & type: Porpoise-class diesel-electric submarine
- Displacement: 1,350 long tons (1,370 t) standard, surfaced; 1,997 long tons (2,029 t) submerged
- Length: 298 ft (91 m) (waterline), 300 ft 6 in (91.59 m) (overall)
- Beam: 25 ft 0.875 in (7.64223 m)
- Draft: 13 ft 9 in (4.19 m)
- Propulsion: (as built) 4 × Fairbanks-Morse Model 38A8 8-cylinder opposed piston diesel engines, 1,300 hp (970 kW) each, driving electrical generators; 3 × Fairbanks-Morse Model 6-38A5 opposed piston auxiliary diesels; (re-engined) 4 × Fairbanks-Morse Model 38D8 1/8 opposed piston diesels, 1,365 hp (1,018 kW) each; one Fairbanks-Morse Model 7-38A5¼ opposed piston auxiliary diesel; 2 × 120-cell Gould AMTX33HB batteries; 4 × high-speed Elliott electric motors with 4.84:1 reduction gears, 1,090 hp (810 kW) each; two shafts
- Speed: 19.25 knots (36 km/h) surfaced; 8.75 knots (16 km/h) submerged
- Range: 11,000 nautical miles (20,000 km) at 10 knots (19 km/h); (bunkerage 92,801 US gallons (351,290 L)
- Endurance: 10 hours at 5 knots (9.3 km/h), 36 hours at minimum speed submerged
- Test depth: 250 ft (76 m)
- Complement: (as built) 5 officers, 45 enlisted; (1945) 8 officers, 65 enlisted
- Armament: 6 × 21 inch (533 mm) (533 mm) torpedo tubes (four forward, two aft, 16 torpedoes); 1 × 4 in (100 mm)/50;caliber deck gun; 4 × .30 cal (7.62 mm) machineguns (2 twin mounts)

USS Plunger (SS-179), a Porpoise-class submarine, was the second ship of the United States Navy to be named plunger after a diver or a daring gambler. Unlike most American submarines of the day, she was not named for a fish or other sea-dwelling creature.

The second Plunger was laid down 17 July 1935 at the Portsmouth Navy Yard in Kittery, Maine; launched 8 July 1936 and sponsored by Miss Edith E. Greenlee, eldest daughter of Captain Halford R. Greenlee, Acting Commandant of the Portsmouth Navy Yard. She was commissioned 19 November 1936, Lt. George L. Russell (later commander of Submarine Squadron 10) in command.

Plunger departed Gravesend Bay, N.Y. 15 April 1937 for a shakedown cruise to Guantanamo Bay, the Canal Zone, and Guayaquil, Ecuador. In November, following post-shakedown alterations at Portsmouth, she steamed to San Diego to join SubDiv 14, SubRon 6 (Submarine Division 14, Submarine Squadron 6). Continuing operations in the San Diego area for the next several years, Plunger joined Holland (AS–3) and five Porpoise-class boats 15 March 1938 for a cruise to Dutch Harbor, Alaska. Training cruises to waters off Panama and Hawaii occupied the next several years. On 30 November 1941, she reported to Pearl Harbor and was off Diamond Head when Japanese planes attacked 7 December. Stricken from the Navy Register 6 July 1956, she was sold to Bethlehem Steel Co., Bethlehem, Pa. on 22 April 1957, and scrapped. Plunger received 14 battle stars for World War II service.

== First and second war patrols, December 1941 – July 1942 ==
Plunger, commanded by David Charles White (Class of 1927) set out on her first patrol less than a week after the Pearl Harbor attack, but had to turn back due to a pressure hull leak. Repaired, she set out again on 14 December.

Along with Gudgeon (SS-211) and Pollack (SS-180), Plunger was part of the first US Navy offensive operation of World War II. Her orders sent her to Kii Suido, a principal entrance into the Inland Sea and an important funnel to industrial bases in the area. The three boats took two important technological devices into enemy waters: the Mark VI magnetic exploder for their Mark 14 torpedoes, and the primitive SD radar set.

Shortly after White arrived on station, Plunger was seen by a Japanese destroyer which came on using powerful echo-ranging sonar—or "pinging". Hearing the pinging was a jolt. The submarine force had not known for certain, until now, that the Japanese had such gear. The Japanese not only had it, they knew how to use it. The destroyer found Plunger and unleashed twenty-four close depth charges. It was a vicious, determined attack, the first for both the hunter and the hunted in Empire waters. It jarred the boat and crew severely. White was thankful that he had put back into Pearl Harbor to repair the weakness in the hull. Had he not, Plunger might not have survived.

She sank Japanese cargo ship Eizon Maru 18 January 1942.

After returning to Pearl Harbor, Plunger was docked on the Marine Railway at Pearl Harbor for repairs when, on 17 February 1942, she slid off the trolley and onto the dock floor. She was salvaged and refloated, after some effort, and returned to service.

Plunger's second war patrol, 5 June to 15 July, took her off Shanghai. On this patrol, she sank the 4,700-ton cargo ship Ukai Maru No. 5 on 30 June and Unyo Maru No. 3 on 2 July before returning to Midway 15 June.

While on this patrol, White nearly sank a ship by accident that would have caused an international uproar. Through diplomatic channels, President Roosevelt had arranged an exchange of political prisoners trapped in the United States and Japan by the outbreak of war, including U.S. Ambassador to Japan Joseph C. Grew. They were put aboard the neutral vessels Asama Maru and S.S. Conte Verde for transfer from Japan to the United States. They were to sail with lights and other markings on a prearranged route, as would the vessels returning the Japanese.
On 5 June, [COMSUBPAC] English had sent instructions to his submarines, describing these ships, the routes, and the markings. Later, on 25 June, when the vessels actually got under way, English sent further messages, designed to assure immunity from submarine attack. Dave White failed to receive these messages. In the early morning hours of 30 June, he picked up Conte Verde and began an approach, somewhat astonished to find a ship all lighted up.
Back at Pearl Harbor, George "Turkey Neck" Crawford was on duty that night in submarine headquarters. "The Communications Officer," Crawford remembered, "came in to see me and wanted to send the immunity message again. I checked through the files and discovered that we had sent it four nights in a row. I questioned the need to send it again. However, the Communications Officer thought it might be a good idea, so, somewhat reluctantly, I put it on the air."
On Plunger, White had Conte Verde fixed in his periscope hairs and the crew at battle stations when his communications officer, having picked up and just decoded this fifth immunity message, rushed up into the conning tower. White broke off the attack at the last minute, settling for a photograph taken through the periscope from a range of 800 yards.

== Third and fourth war patrols, October 1942 – January 1943 ==
In October, as U.S. forces pushed on to Matanikau and Cape Esperance, Plunger departed Pearl Harbor on 12 October on its third war patrol to reconnoiter the area and to block the "Tokyo Express." On 2 November while patrolling off of Maringe Lagoon, lookouts sighted an airplane and Plunger submerged to avoid detection. Charts showed deep water at this location, dive depth was set at 55 feet. However, Plunger hit an uncharted reef at 52 feet, Q.C. head hit first, jamming. Immediately thereafter Plunger's hull hit midship on the coral reef destroying her sound gear and damaging her bottom. Plunger's third patrol was terminated by order of the Task Force Commander after the vessel had been on station for only five days. This action was taken due to the probability of serious oil and or air leaks as a result of the accident.

After repairing at Brisbane, Plunger returned to the Guadalcanal area for her fourth war patrol and operated off Munda, where Japanese barges were coming in at night, unloading troops and supplies, and departing by daybreak. On the night of 16 – 17 December she slipped past four destroyers and attacked two others unloading at Munda Bar. After seeing two of her "fish" explode, she slipped away from a counterattack. After another attack with unknown results the next night, and a bomber attack while heading home 8 January 1943, she arrived Pearl Harbor 12 January.

== 1943 ==
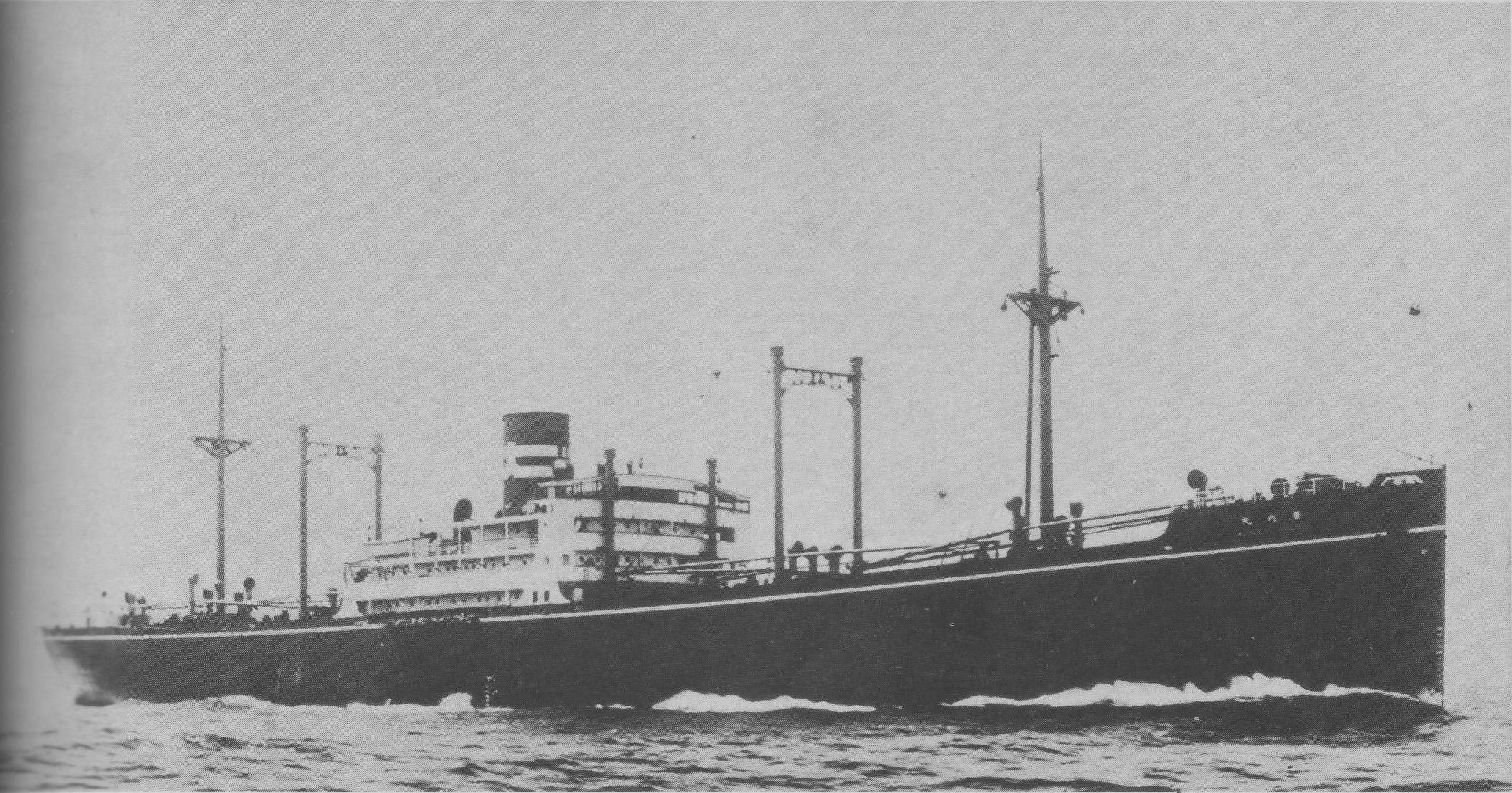
Kinai Maru.

Plunger continued reconnaissance patrols throughout the spring and summer. She sank Taihosan Maru 12 March, and Tatsutake Maru and Kinai Maru 10 May. In June, she joined Lapon (SS-260) and Permit (SS-178) in the first U.S. penetration into the Sea of Japan, an area abounding with Japanese shipping. Crossing the southern end of the Sea of Okhotsk, the ships returned to Midway 26 July but departed again 6 August to return to the Sea of Okhotsk. Plunger sank 3,404-ton Seitai Maru there 20 August and 4,655-ton Ryokai Maru 22 August. Returning to Pearl Harbor 5 September, the ships were the only U.S. vessels to complete two patrols to this area until the final weeks of the war.

In October, Plunger reconnoitered in the Marshalls area. She added lifeguard duties to her resume as U.S. bombers hit the islands, picking up a downed aviator 15 November. During the rescue, a Zero strafed the boat, seriously wounding the executive officer and five bluejackets. Nevertheless, the submarine rescued Lt. (j.g.) Franklin G. Schramm.

== 1944–1945 ==
Frequent depth charge attacks pursued Plunger in January 1944 as she patrolled off the Japanese main islands. The risk was profitable, however, as she sank Toyo Maru No. 5 and Toyo Maru No. 8 on 2 February and Kimishima Maru on 23 February. Returning to Pearl Harbor 8 March, Plunger departed again 8 May to patrol the Bonin Islands. In July, she patrolled in and around Truk.

On 19 September 1944 she reported to Pearl Harbor for overhaul. She departed 15 February 1945 for New London, to serve in a training capacity until 25 October, when she reported to New Haven for Navy Day celebrations. On 30 October she reported to the Boston Navy Yard, where she decommissioned 15 November 1945.

== Post-war service ==
Retained in an inactive status, Plunger was fitted for service as a Naval Reserve Training vessel and reported to Brooklyn, N.Y. in May 1946, remaining there until 8 May 1952, when she departed for Jacksonville, Florida to support the Naval Reserve Training Program. Returning to New York 18 February 1954, she was declared inessential 5 July 1956. Stricken from the Navy Register 6 July 1956, she was sold to Bethlehem Steel Co., Bethlehem, Pa. 22 April 1957, and scrapped.

== Honors and awards ==
- Asiatic-Pacific Campaign Medal with 14 battle stars for World War II service

== Bibliography ==
- Alden, John D., Commander, USN (retired) (1979). The Fleet Submarine in the U.S. Navy. Annapolis, MD: Naval Institute Press.
- Blair, Clay (1975). Silent Victory. Philadelphia and New York: J. B. Lippincott & Co. ISBN 978-1-55750-217-9.
