= Kinai Maru (1930) =

Japanese cargo ship

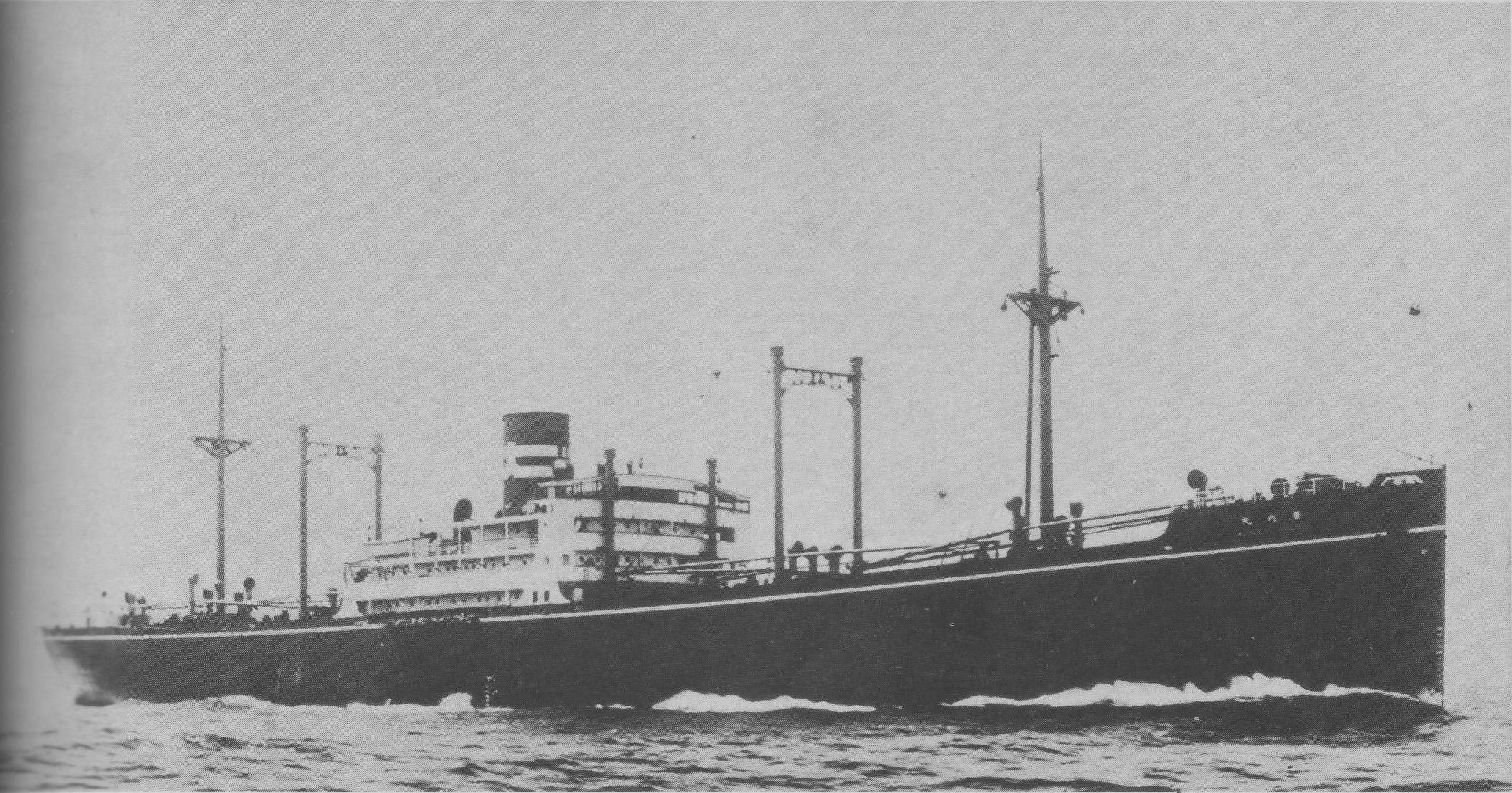
- Kinai Maru

History
- Name: Kinai Maru
- Builder: Mitsubishi, Nagasaki
- Launched: 1 April 1930
- Identification: Official number: 35936; Code Letters JJBC
- Fate: Sunk on 11 May 1943

General characteristics
- Tonnage: 8,360 GRT; 5,041 NRT
- Length: 446 ft (136 m)
- Beam: 60.5 ft (18.4 m)
- Depth: 40.7 ft (12.4 m)
- Installed power: Oil engines, twin screw, 1495 NHP, built by Mitsubishi Zosen Kaisha.

MV Kinai Maru was an 8360-gross register ton freighter built by Mitsubishi Shipbuilding & Engineering Company Ltd, Nagasaki, Japan, in 1930 for Osaka Shosen Kaisha for the Yokohama-New York City cargo run. Launched on 1 April 1930 and completed on 15 June, she was slated for an express service between Yokohama and New York. She broke the industry standard of 35 days by covering the route in 25 days. She plied this route until the outbreak of World War II and was requisitioned into Imperial Japanese Navy as a transport in late 1941.

Employed in support of Japan's war effort she participated in landing troops at the Battle of Milne Bay. On 10 May 1943, she was torpedoed by the submarine USS Plunger near Truk at 0400. Stopped in the water, Tatsutake Maru came alongside and started transferring the 4,000 passengers and troops. At 0748 Plunger torpedoed Tatsutake Maru while she was still alongside Kinai Maru and Tatsutake Maru sank by the stern at 14-29N, 149-23E. At 1253, Plunger found Kinai Maru still afloat and torpedoed her again, without sinking her. The Japanese torpedo boat Hiyodori rescued the survivors of Tatsutake Maru and Kinai Maru and left the area. Still afloat on 11 May at 0600, Plunger surfaced and sank her by gunfire at 14°33′N 149°23′E.

== See also ==
- Foreign commerce and shipping of Empire of Japan
