= 5th Sasebo Special Naval Landing Force =

The 5th Sasebo Special Naval Landing Force (5th Sasebo SNLF) was an infantry battalion of the Imperial Japanese Navy's Special Naval Landing Forces.

Formed at the Sasebo Naval District, the 5th Sasebo SNLF participated in the invasion of Buna-Gona, the New Guinea Campaign and the battle of Milne Bay.

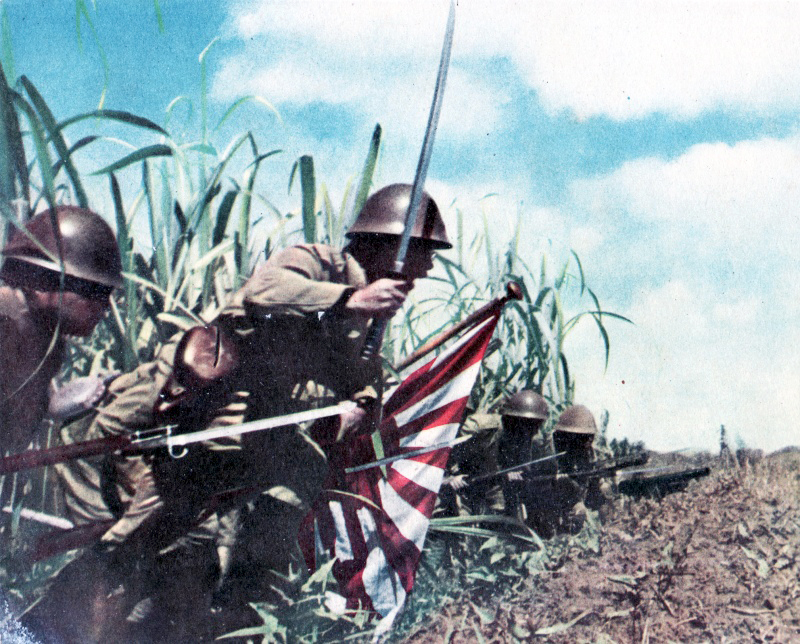
SNLF, 5th Sasebo, Lt Colonel Hatsuo Tsukamoto leading a Banzai charge, New Guinea 1942
