= Shojiro Hayashi =

- 林鉦次郎
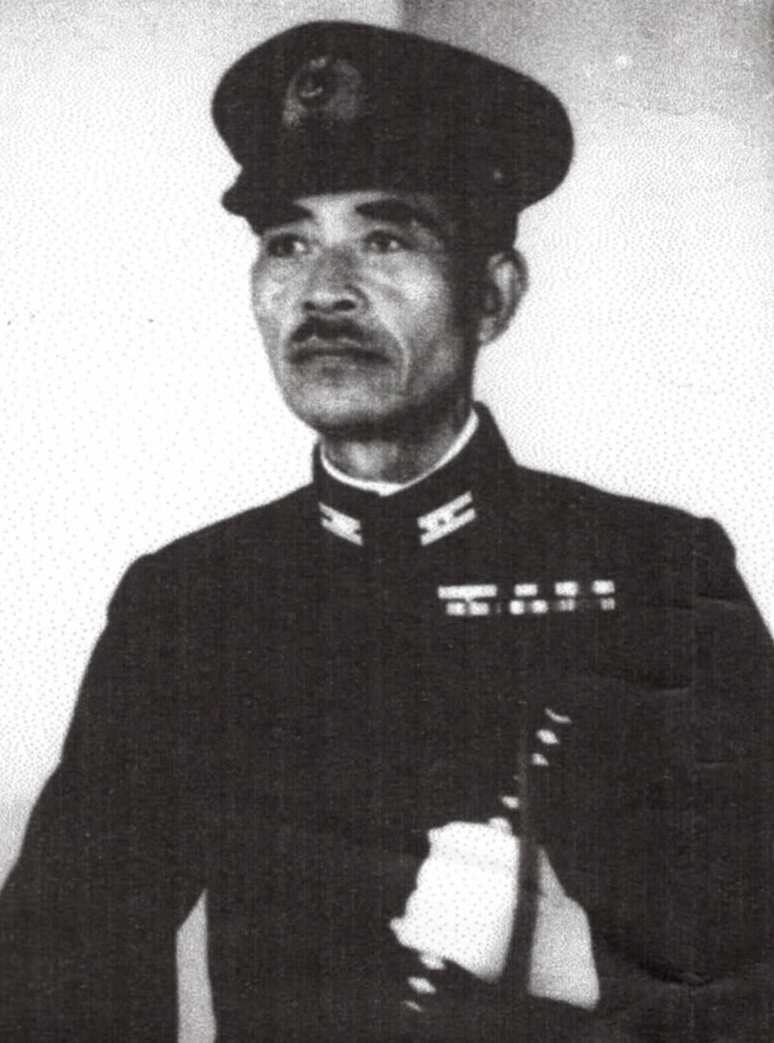
- Military career
- Allegiance: Empire of Japan
- Branch: Imperial Japanese Navy
- Rank: Captain (posthumous)
- Commands: Kure 5th SNLF
- Conflicts: World War II; Battle of Milne Bay

Shojiro Hayashi was an officer in the Imperial Japanese Navy during World War II. He was a member of the 51st Class of the Imperial Japanese Naval Academy, ranking 182 out of 255 Cadets. He was in command of forces during the Battle of Milne Bay (specifically, the 5th Kure Naval District Special Naval Landing Force (SNLF)) until he was apparently killed during the battle. Other sources state that he was relieved of command by Minoru Yano.

== Known Assignments ==
- Division Officer Kinu - 1 December 1930 - ???
- Division Officer Ise - 1 November 1934 - ???
- Commanding Officer, 6th Sasebo Naval District Special Naval Landing Force (SNLF) - 20 December 1937 - 27 January 1938
- Staff Officer, Kure Guard Force - 20 November 1941 - 15 January 1942
- Commanding Officer, 1st Kure Naval District Special Naval Landing Force (SNLF) - 21 January 1942 - 10 March 1942
- Commanding Officer, 5th Kure Naval District Special Naval Landing Force (SNLF) - 1 May 1942 - 1 September 1942

== Promotions ==
- Midshipman - 14 July 1923
- Ensign - 1 December 1924
- Sub-Lieutenant - 1 December 1926
- Lieutenant - 30 November 1929
- Lieutenant Commander - 15 November 1935
- Commander - 15 November 1940
- Captain - 1 September 1942 (posthumous)
