= Nankai Maru =

History
- Name: Nankai Maru
- Launched: 5 July 1932
- Identification: Official number: 38116; Code Letters JKME
- Fate: Sunk, 12 September 1944

General characteristics
- Tonnage: 8,416 GRT; 5,105 NRT
- Length: 446.8 ft (136.2 m)
- Beam: 60.5 ft (18.4 m)
- Depth: 40.7 ft (12.4 m)
- Installed power: 1,678 NHP, built by Mitsubishi Zosen Kaisha
- Propulsion: Oil engines, twin screw

MV Nankai Maru was an 8,416-gross register ton (GRT) cargo ship built by Mitsubishi Shipbuilding & Engineering Company Ltd, Nagasaki, Japan, in 1933 for Osaka Shosen Kaisha.

She was requisitioned by the Imperial Japanese Navy for use as a transport in late 1941. She was part of the invasion fleet for the Midway operation in June 1942 and the Battle of Milne Bay in August–September 1942, where she was damaged by a bomb. She also took part in the Guadalcanal campaign of August 1942–February 1943, in which she was also damaged by a bomb. She was struck by a dud torpedo from the United States Navy submarine USS Kingfish on 8 December 1942 in the Philippine Sea near Okinotorishima. On 25 December 1942, she was damaged by a torpedo from the submarine USS Seadragon in St. George's Channel near Cape St. George, New Ireland, and then collided with the Japanese destroyer Uzuki while Uzuki was maneuvering to counterattack Seadragon. Nankai Maru was sunk during a voyage from Singapore by a torpedo from the submarine USS Sealion on 12 September 1944 in the South China Sea east of Hainan Island at 18°42′N 114°30′E.
