= 5th Kure Special Naval Landing Force =

The 5th Kure Special Naval Landing Force (5th Kure SNLF) was a naval infantry battalion of the Imperial Japanese Navy's Special Naval Landing Forces.

The unit was formed at the Kure Naval District on May 1, 1942, in anticipation of the Battle of Midway. Following the IJN's defeat at Midway, part of the 5th Kure SNLF participated as one of the main landing forces in the battle of Milne Bay. The unit survived the battle, albeit with considerable casualties and was disbanded shortly afterwards.

== Commanders ==
- Commander Shojiro Hayashi
