= 46th Engineer Battalion (United States) =

- Coat of Arms
- Active: 1917-present
- Country: United States
- Branch: United States Army Corps of Engineers
- Type: Combat Engineer
- Role: Construction Engineering
- Size: Battalion
- Part of: 20th Engineer Brigade
- Garrison/HQ: Ft. Polk, LA
- Nickname: Steel Spike
- Motto: TO ACHIEVE

Insignia
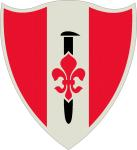
- Distinctive Unit Insignia

The 46th Engineer Battalion ("Steel Spike") is a military engineer unit in the United States Army that was formally established in 1917.

== Mission ==
On order, the 46th Engineer Battalion deploys to command, to control, and to execute combat and/or general engineering in support of U.S. Army, Joint, and Coalition Forces.

== Organization ==
The Battalion consist of the following units:

- HHC
- FSC
- 22nd S+D DET (Inactivated)
- 93rd EN CO (VERT) (Inactivated)
- 178th EN CO (VERT) (Inactivated)
- 524th EN DET
- 573rd EN CO
- 687th EN CO
- 642nd EN CO (Fort Drum, NY, now under 41st EN BN)
- 814th MRBC (moved to Korea under 11th EN BN)

== Lineage ==
Constituted 7 December 1917 in the National Army as the 46th Engineers

Organized March–April 1918 at Camp Sheridan, Alabama

Converted and redesignated 18 September 1918 as the 46th Regiment, Transportation Corps

Regiment broken up 12 November 1918 and its elements reorganized and redesignated as follows:

- Regimental Headquarters and Headquarters Company disbanded
- Companies A, B, and C redesignated 12 December 1918 each as the 29th, 30th, and 31st Companies, Transportation Corps, respectively

29th Company, Transportation Corps, demobilized 13 July 1919 at Camp Devens, Massachusetts; 30th and 31st Companies, Transportation Corps, demobilized 2 July and 11 July 1919, respectively, at Camp Gordon, Georgia

Regiment reconstituted 1 October 1933 in the Regular Army as the 46th Engineers

Activated 14 July 1941 at Camp Bowie, Texas

Redesignated 18 March 1943 as the 46th Engineer General Service Regiment

Reorganized and redesignated 22 April 1944 as the 46th Engineer Construction Battalion

Reorganized and redesignated 15 June 1947 as Headquarters and Headquarters and Service Company, 46th Engineer Construction Battalion (organic elements concurrently absorbed)

Inactivated 15 March 1950 in Japan

Redesignated 22 September 1950 as the 46th Engineer Construction Battalion and activated at Fort Sill, Oklahoma (organic elements concurrently reconstituted and activated)

Reorganized and redesignated 23 November 1953 as the 46th Engineer Battalion

Battalion departs the Republic of Vietnam (South Vietnam) in 1971 and is assigned to Fort Rucker, Alabama under the 18th Engineer Brigade. The battalion deploys to the Republic of Honduras in the fall of 1983 to construct base camp facilities and airfields as part of Operation Ahuas Tara II before returning to Fort Rucker in the spring of 1984. The battalion deploys to Operation Desert Shield in the fall of 1990, serving in Operation Desert Storm and returning to Fort Rucker in May 1991. In late 1993, segments of the battalion deployed to Colombia, South America to participate in the construction of several community and infrastructure projects. Those segments returned to Fort Rucker in early 1994. In mid-1994, the battalion is relocated to Fort Polk, Louisiana due to the Base Realignment and Closure (BRAC) and to support the Joint Readiness Training Center (JRTC). This relocation did not include Bravo Company.

1996: Deployment to Haiti in support of NATO mission under President Bill Clinton.

16 October 1999: Battalion reorganized as a multi-component unit; Company C concurrently inactivated. The 890th Engineer Company (Tennessee Army National Guard) reorganized and redesignated as Company C, 46th Engineer Battalion. This company was also located at Ft. Rucker Alabama. It was deactivated and moved to Ft. Polk La.

October 2005: the battalion was deployed to Iraq. During the one-year deployment, A Company and C Company were based from Al-Taqqadum with elements near Syria and Ramadi. B Company and HHC were primarily operated from Camp Ramadi. Elements of the battalion participated in the Battle of Ramadi (2006) establishing combat outposts (COPs) and patrol bases throughout the city. These operations were often executed under direct fire and/or indirect fire. Four members of the battalion were KIA during the duration of the deployment—two due to mortar attacks and two to improvised explosive devices.

October 2006: the battalion returns to the United States.

February 2010: B Company deactivated while still garrisoned at Fort Rucker, Alabama. The battalion is transformed from legacy to modular battalion on 16 February 2010.

== Campaign participation credit ==
World War I

- Streamer without inscription

World War II

- East Indies
- Papua
- New Guinea
- Leyte (with arrowhead)
- Luzon

Vietnam

- Defense
- Counteroffensive
- Counteroffensive, Phase II
- Counteroffensive Phase III
- Tet Counteroffensive
- Counteroffensive Phase IV
- Counteroffensive Phase V
- Counteroffensive Phase VI
- Tet 69/Counteroffensive
- Summer-Fall 1969
- Winter-Spring 1970
- Sanctuary Counteroffensive
- Counteroffensive Phase VII
- Consolidation I

Southwest Asia

- Defense of Saudi Arabia
- Liberation and Defense of Kuwait
- Operation Iraqi Freedom

== Decorations ==
- Presidential Unit Citation (Army) for PAPUA
- Meritorious Unit Commendation (Army) for LEYTE
- Meritorious Unit Commendation (Army) for PHILIPPINE ISLANDS
- Meritorious Unit Commendation (Army) for VIETNAM 1966–1967
- Meritorious Unit Commendation (Army) for VIETNAM 1967
- Meritorious Unit Commendation (Army) for SOUTHWEST ASIA
- Army Superior Unit Award for 1995–1996
- Army Superior Unit Award for 2011–2013 (DCRF mission)
- Philippine Presidential Unit Citation for 17 OCTOBER 1944 TO 4 JULY 1945
- Republic of Vietnam Civil Action Honor Medal, First Class for VIETNAM 1967–1970
