= 43rd Engineer Battalion (United States) =

- Active: 1917–1919; 1933–1958; 1966–1994
- Country: United States
- Branch: United States Army Corps of Engineers
- Type: Combat Engineer
- Role: Combat Engineer
- Size: Battalion
- Motto(s): Power for Service

The 43rd Engineer Battalion was a military engineer unit in the United States Army first formed in 1917.

== Lineage ==
Formed on 3 December 1917 as the 43d Engineers (Auxiliary Forestry Battalion) and was organized on 4 January 1918, at Camp American University, Washington.

The battalion was reorganized and redesignated on 18 October 1918, and its elements were reorganized and redesignated as follows:

- Headquarters, 14th Battalion and 46th, 47th, 48th and 49th Companies, 20th Engineers.

The battalion was demobilized on 26 June 1919 at Camp Lee, Virginia.

Reconstituted 1 October 1933 as the 43rd Engineers (General Service) and was activated at Fort Snelling, Minnesota on 10 February 1941, before being redesignated on 16 March 1943 as the 43rd Engineer General Service Regiment. The 1st and 2nd Battalions were disbanded on 22 April 1944 in Australia, with the remainder of the regiment reorganized and redesignated as the 43rd Engineer Construction Battalion on 9 May 1944. The battalion was reorganized and redesignated as Headquarters, Headquarters and Service Company, 43rd Engineer Construction Battalion on 15 June 1947 (organic elements concurrently reconstituted and activated). The battalion was later reorganized and redesignated as the 43rd Engineer Construction Battalion on 1 June 1949 (organic elements concurrently reconstituted and activated) in Japan before being redesignated on 28 March 1954 as the 43rd Engineer Battalion (Construction). The battalion was inactivated on 25 June 1958 in Korea.

The battalion was reactivated on 25 April 1966 at Fort Benning, Georgia, and was later inactivated on 15 July 1994.

== Campaign participation credit ==
World War I: Streamer without inscription

World War II: East Indies; Papua; New Guinea; Luzon

Southwest Asia: Defense of Saudi Arabia; Liberation and Defense of Kuwait

Armed Forces Expeditions: Somalia

== Decorations ==
- Presidential Unit Citation (Army) for PAPUA
- Meritorious Unit Commendation (Army) for PACIFIC THEATER 1944
- Meritorious Unit Commendation (Army) for PACIFIC THEATER 1945–1946
- Philippine Republic Presidential Unit Citation for 17 OCTOBER 1944 TO 4 JULY 1945
- Meritorious Unit Commendation (Army) for SOUTHWEST ASIA for 9 AUGUST 1990 TO 2 MAY 1991
- Joint Meritorious Unit Award, for SOMALIA for 5 DECEMBER 1992 TO 4 MAY 1993
- Army Superior Unit Award for 1992
