= Japanese submarine chaser CH-22 =

No. 13 class submarine chaser

History

Empire of Japan
- Name: CH-22
- Builder: Mitsubishi Heavy Industries, Yokohama
- Launched: 29 May 1941
- Completed: 12 October 1941
- Fate: Sunk, 19 February 1944

General characteristics
- Class & type: No.13-class submarine chaser
- Displacement: 438 long tons (445 t) standard
- Length: 51 m (167 ft 4 in) o/a
- Beam: 6.7 m (22 ft 0 in)
- Draught: 2.75 m (9 ft 0 in)
- Propulsion: 2 × Kampon Mk.23A Model 8 diesels, 2 shafts, 1,700 bhp (1,268 kW)
- Speed: 16 knots (30 km/h; 18 mph)
- Range: 2,000 nmi (3,700 km) at 14 kn (26 km/h; 16 mph)
- Complement: 68
- Sensors & processing systems: 1 × Type 93 active sonar; 1 × Type 93 hydrophone
- Armament: 1 × 76.2 mm (3 in) L/40 AA gun; 2 × Type 93 13.2 mm (0.52 in) AA guns; 36 × Type 95 depth charges; 2 × Type 94 depth charge projectors; 1 × depth charge thrower

The Japanese submarine chaser CH-22 was a No.13-class submarine chaser of the Imperial Japanese Navy during World War II. She was built by Mitsubishi Heavy Industries, Yokohama, launched on 29 May 1941 and completed on 12 October 1941. On 24 August 1942, she left Rabaul as part of Operation RE, for the landings at Milne Bay.

== Fate ==
On 19 February 1944, while off Kavieng, New Ireland in Convoy O-902, she was attacked by United States Army Air Forces B-25's of the 500th and 501st Bombardment Squadrons, A-20's of the 3rd Bombardment Group and P-38's and was sunk at 03°04′S 150°42′E.
