= Mitsuharu Matsuyama =

- 松山 光治
- Born: January 12, 1891; Kagawa Prefecture, Japan
- Died: September 21, 1959 (aged 68)
- Military career
- Allegiance: Empire of Japan
- Branch: Imperial Japanese Navy
- Service years: 1912–1945
- Rank: Rear Admiral
- Commands: Sunosaki, Kitakami, Nagara, Kinugasa, Takao, Asahi, Maizuru Sailor Corps, Kure Sailor Corps, Kure Naval Guard Corps, 18th Squadron, Tateyama Naval Gunnery School, 7th Escort Group, 105th Squadron
- Conflicts: World War II; Pacific War

Rear Admiral Mitsuharu Matsuyama (松山 光治; January 12, 1891 – September 21, 1959) was a senior officer in the Imperial Japanese Navy during World War II. He was an observer during the First Battle of Savo Island.

== Commands & Positions ==
- Gunnery Officer, Isuzu - 1 December 1925 - 1 December 1926
- Gunnery Officer, Haruna - 10 October 1929 - 1 December 1930
- 2nd Fleet Staff Officer - 1 December 1930 - 1 December 1931
- Commanding Officer, Kitakami - 10 October 1935 - 1 December 1937
- Commanding Officer, Nagara - 1 December 1936 - 20 February 1937 (additional duty while Commanding Officer of Kitakami)
- Commanding Officer, Kinugasa - 1 December 1937 - 3 June 1938
- Commanding Officer, Takao - 3 June 1938 - 15 November 1939
- Commanding Officer, Asahi - 15 November 1939 - 15 November 1940
- Commanding Officer, Maizuru Sailor Corps - 15 November 1940 - 11 August 1941
- Commanding Officer, Kure Sailor Corps - 11 August 1941 - 11 June 1942
- Commanding Officer, Kure Naval Guard Corps - 20 November 1941 - 11 June 1942 (additional duty while assigned to Kure)
- ComCruDiv 18–11 June 1942 - 24 December 1942
- Director, Tateyama Gunnery School - 6 January 1943 - 27 December 1943
- Navy General Headquarters, Tokyo 1943-1944
- Commander, 7th Escort Group - 8 April 1944 - 23 December 1944
- Member, Grand Escort Fleet, Tokyo 1944-1945
- Commander, 105th Escort Squadron - 5 May 1945 - 15 September 1945

== Promotions ==
- Midshipman - 17 July 1912
- Ensign - 1 December 1913
- Lieutenant (j.g.) - 13 December 1915
- Lieutenant - 1 December 1918
- Lieutenant Commander - 1 December 1924
- Commander - 1 December 1930
- Captain - 15 November 1934
- Rear Admiral - 15 November 1940
