= List of aerial victories claimed by Werner Schröer =

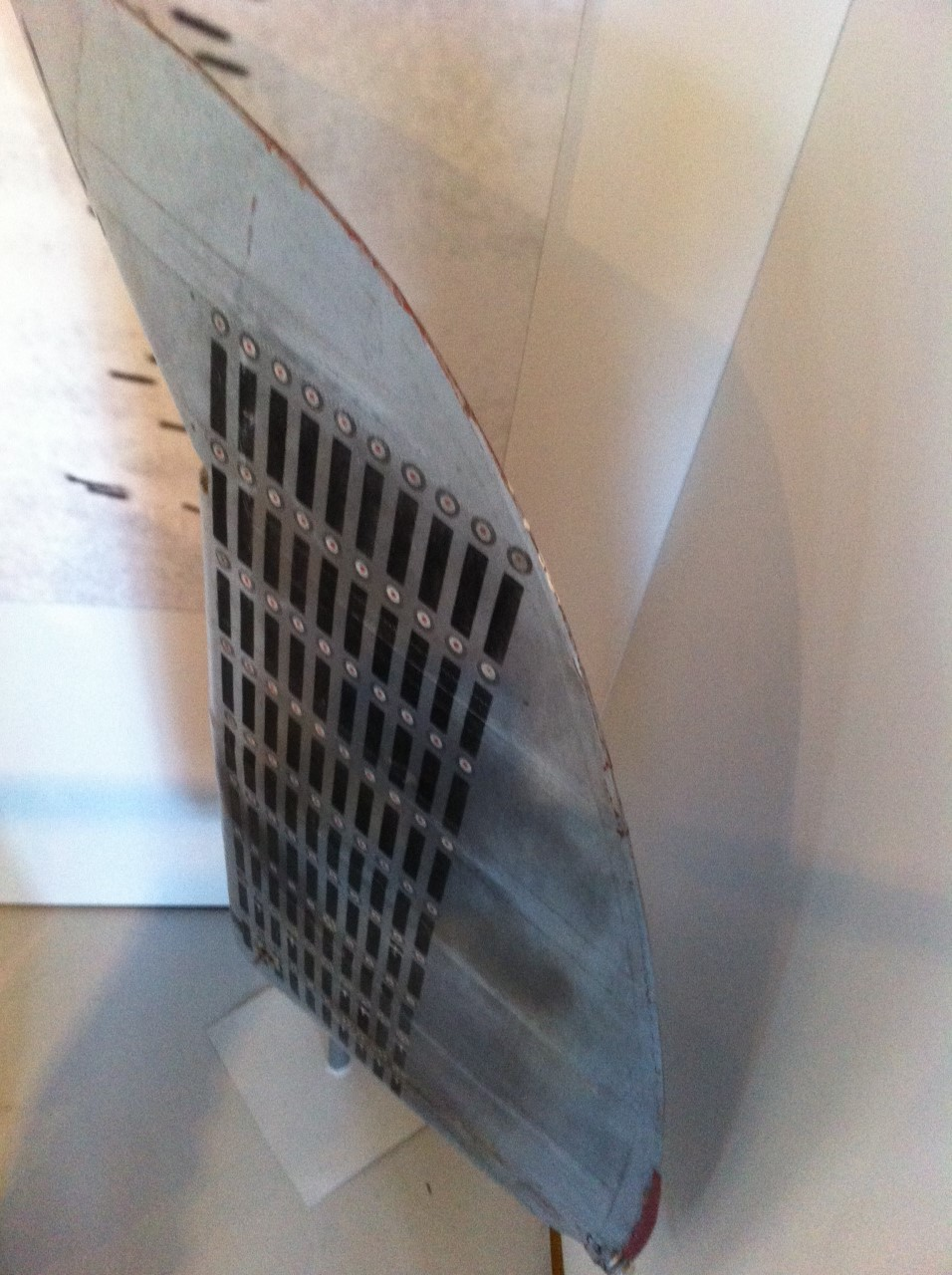
Schröer's Messerschmitt Bf 109 rudder with 90 victory markings. This rudder is on display at the Militärhistorisches Museum Flugplatz Berlin-Gatow.

Werner Schröer (Note: According to his [Werner Schröer] statement family name was Schroer until 1968 and Schröer from then on.) (12 February 1918 – 10 February 1985) was a German World War II fighter ace credited with shooting down 114 enemy aircraft. He served in the Luftwaffe from 1937, initially as a member of the ground staff, until the end of World War II in Europe on 8 May 1945, by which time he had reached the highest ranks of combat leadership. Schröer was the second most successful claimant of air victories after Hans-Joachim Marseille in the Mediterranean, and was decorated with the Knight's Cross of the Iron Cross with Oak Leaves and Swords.

== List of aerial victories claimed ==
According to US historian David T. Zabecki, Schröer was credited with 114 aerial victories. Obermaier also lists Schröer with 114 enemy aircraft shot down claimed in 197 combat missions, the majority of which on the Western Front, including 61 in North Africa and 22 in Italy, and a mission-to-claim ratio of 1.73. This figure includes 26 four-engined bombers, four of which claimed as Herausschüsse (separation shots). Mathews and Foreman, authors of Luftwaffe Aces – Biographies and Victory Claims, researched the German Federal Archives and found records for 106 aerial victory claims, plus eight further unconfirmed claims. This figure includes 12 aerial victories on the Eastern Front and 94 over the Western Allies, including 23 four-engine bomber.

This and the ♠ (Ace of spades) indicates those aerial victories which made Schröer an "ace-in-a-day", a term which designates a fighter pilot who has shot down five or more airplanes in a single day.
This and the – (dash) indicates unconfirmed aerial victory claims for which Schröer did not receive credit.
This and the ? (question mark) indicates that Australian author Russell Brown has expressed doubt regarding the veracity of Schröer's claims on this day.
This along with the * (asterisk) indicates an Herausschuss (separation shot)—a severely damaged heavy bomber forced to separate from his combat box which was counted as an aerial victory.

Claim	Date	Time	Type	Location	Unit	Claim	Date	Time	Type	Location	Unit
– Claims with I. Gruppe of Jagdgeschwader 27 – In North Africa — April 1941 – June 1942
1	19 April 1941	—	Hurricane	west of Tobruk	1./JG 27	7	14 September 1941	15:55	Hurricane	south of El Hambra	1./JG 27
2	25 June 1941	14:20	Hurricane	south of Sidi Barrani	1./JG 27	8	30 May 1942	14:05	P-40	northeast of Bir Hacheim	Stab I./JG 27
3	8 July 1941	07:00	Hurricane	west of Bardia	1./JG 27	9	10 June 1942	07:49	P-40	5 km (3.1 mi) west of Bir Hacheim	Stab I./JG 27
4	19 July 1941	18:17	P-40	northeast of Ras Asaz	1./JG 27	10	15 June 1942	18:06	P-40	northwest of El Adem	Stab I./JG 27
5	21 August 1941	18:20	Hurricane	northeast of Bardia	1./JG 27	11	15 June 1942	18:11	P-40	northwest of El Adem	Stab I./JG 27
6	29 August 1941	18:10	P-40	northwest of Sidi Barrani	1./JG 27						
– Claims with III. Gruppe of Jagdgeschwader 27 – In North Africa — June 1942 – November 1942
12	23 June 1942	14:40	P-40	10 km (6.2 mi) south of Sidi Omar	8./JG 27	37♠	15 September 1942?	11:55	P-40	south of El Alamein	8./JG 27
13	26 June 1942	11:40	P-40	southwest of Mersa Matruh	8./JG 27	38♠	15 September 1942?	16:45	P-40	northeast of Deir El Tarfa	8./JG 27
14	26 June 1942	11:44	Hurricane	southwest of Mersa Matruh	8./JG 27	39♠	15 September 1942?	16:55	P-40	northeast of Deir El Tarfa	8./JG 27
15	26 June 1942	16:10	P-40	southwest of Mersa Matruh	8./JG 27	40♠	15 September 1942?	17:03	Spitfire	vicinity of El Alamein	8./JG 27
16	2 July 1942	07:00	P-40	southeast of El Alamein	8./JG 27	41	16 September 1942	09:25	P-40	south of El Alamein	8./JG 27
17	2 July 1942	07:05	P-40	east of El Alamein	8./JG 27	42	20 September 1942	16:33	P-40	8 km (5.0 mi) southwest of El Alamein	8./JG 27
18	3 July 1942	14:40	Hurricane	south of Imayid	8./JG 27	43	21 September 1942	16:30	Spitfire	north of El Hammam	8./JG 27
19	3 July 1942	14:47	Hurricane	southeast of El Hammam	8./JG 27	44	30 September 1942	10:30	Spitfire	south-southwest of El Alamein	8./JG 27
20	3 July 1942	14:50	P-40	southeast of El Hammam	8./JG 27	45	2 October 1942	15:40	P-40	north-northeast of Deir El Tarfa	8./JG 27
21	4 July 1942	18:40	P-40	southeast of El Alamein	8./JG 27	46	9 October 1942	09:25	Boston	northeast of El Dabaa	8./JG 27
22	6 July 1942	11:45	P-40	20 km (12 mi) southwest of El Alamein	8./JG 27	47	9 October 1942	16:15	Spitfire	northwest of El Dabaa	8./JG 27
23	6 July 1942	11:48	P-40	21 km (13 mi) southwest of El Alamein	8./JG 27	48	9 October 1942	16:20	Hurricane	southeast of Bir el Abd	8./JG 27
24	11 July 1942	16:05	Spitfire	southeast of El Alamein	8./JG 27	49	20 October 1942	14:12	P-40	southwest of Deir El Tarfa	8./JG 27
25	11 July 1942	16:10	P-40	southwest of El Alamein	8./JG 27	50	23 October 1942	08:00	P-46	northeast of El Alamein	8./JG 27
26	13 July 1942	09:57	Hurricane	south of El Hammam	8./JG 27	51	23 October 1942	08:30	P-46	southeast of El Alamein	8./JG 27
27	13 July 1942	10:02	Hurricane	south of El Hammam	8./JG 27	52	24 October 1942	08:25	P-40	northeast of El Alamein	8./JG 27
28	13 July 1942	10:05	Hurricane	south of El Hammam	8./JG 27	53	24 October 1942	16:45	Hurricane	southwest of El Alamein	8./JG 27
29	14 July 1942	10:15	P-40	southwest of El Alamein	8./JG 27	54	26 October 1942	13:10	P-40	west of El Alamein	8./JG 27
30	16 July 1942	18:30	P-40	southwest of El Alamein	8./JG 27	55	27 October 1942	—	P-40	northwest of Quotaifiya	8./JG 27
31	17 July 1942	18:25	P-40	west of El Alamein	8./JG 27	56	27 October 1942	—	P-40	northeast of Quotaifiya	8./JG 27
32	8 September 1942	12:45	Spitfire	vicinity of Deir El Tarfa	8./JG 27	57	27 October 1942	—	P-40	northeast of El Dabaa	8./JG 27
33	8 September 1942	12:50	Spitfire	vicinity of Deir El Tarfa	8./JG 27	58	29 October 1942	12:25	Spitfire	south of El Alamein	8./JG 27
34	13 September 1942	17:25	P-40	7 km (4.3 mi) southwest of El Alamein	8./JG 27	59	30 October 1942	09:20	P-39	south-southeast of El Dabaa	8./JG 27
35♠	15 September 1942?	11:40	P-40	west of El Alamein	8./JG 27	60	4 November 1942	12:15	B-24	between Sollum and Benghazi	8./JG 27
36♠	15 September 1942?	11:43	P-40	west of El Alamein	8./JG 27	61	16 November 1942	15:20	P-40	south of Tecis	8./JG 27
– Claims with III. Gruppe of Jagdgeschwader 27 – Eastern Mediterranean, Crete, Sicily, Greece, Tunisia and Italy — November 1942 – February 1943
62	11 February 1943 (Note: On 11 February 1943, on a shuttle flight from Rhodes to Crete, Schröer intercepted and claimed two light bombers which he identified as Bristol Beaufort bombers north-northeast Karpathos. RAF records show that two Martin B-26 Marauder bombers were lost on 15 February and the time of the claims filed by Schröer. Authors Prien, Rodeike and Stemmer argue that at the time the B-26 was a new and unknown aircraft type to Schröer while the date discrepancy cannot be explained.)	13:30	B-26	north-northeast Karpathos	8./JG 27	63	11 February 1943	13:34	B-26	north-northeast Karpathos	8./JG 27
– Claims with II. Gruppe of Jagdgeschwader 27 – Sicily, Tunisia and Italy — February – July 1943
64	29 April 1943	18:08	P-38	60 km (37 mi) southeast of Marettimo	Stab II./JG 27	75	25 May 1943	11:17	B-17	40 km (25 mi) northwest Marettimo	Stab II./JG 27
65	29 April 1943	18:10	P-38	60 km (37 mi) southeast Marettimo	Stab II./JG 27	76	31 May 1943	14:40	B-17	west-northwest Trapani	Stab II./JG 27
66	5 May 1943	15:00	B-24	northwest Marettimo	Stab II./JG 27	77	7 June 1943	06:44	P-40	5 km (3.1 mi) north Pantelleria	Stab II./JG 27
67	9 May 1943	13:10	B-24	15 km (9.3 mi) east Capo Gallo	Stab II./JG 27	78	10 June 1943	09:26	P-46	3 km (1.9 mi) south-southwest Granitola Torreta	Stab II./JG 27
68	9 May 1943	13:40	P-38	70 km (43 mi) northwest Capo San Vito	Stab II./JG 27	79	10 June 1943	09:27	P-46	4 km (2.5 mi) south-southwest Granitola Torreta	Stab II./JG 27
69	11 May 1943	11:46	P-38	60 km (37 mi) northeast Cap Bon	Stab II./JG 27	—	10 June 1943	—	Boston	Pantelleria	Stab II./JG 27
70	11 May 1943	12:14	B-17	25 km (16 mi) south Marsala	Stab II./JG 27	80	15 June 1943	08:23	B-17	2 km (1.2 mi) west Favignana	Stab II./JG 27
71	18 May 1943	13:45	B-17	50 km (31 mi) northwest Trapani	Stab II./JG 27	81	11 July 1943	13:20	B-24	25 km (16 mi) south Crotone	Stab II./JG 27
72	19 May 1943	13:42	P-38	west Marettimo	Stab II./JG 27	82	16 July 1943	13:00	B-24	5 km (3.1 mi) southwest Santeramo in Colle	Stab II./JG 27
73	21 May 1943	11:21	B-17	35 km (22 mi) south Marsala	Stab II./JG 27	83	16 July 1943	13:15	B-24	10 km (6.2 mi) west-southwest Bari	Stab II./JG 27
74	21 May 1943	11:28	Spitfire	23 km (14 mi) northwest Pantelleria	Stab II./JG 27	84	23 July 1943	14:10	B-17	20 km (12 mi) north Stromboli	Stab II./JG 27
– Claims with II. Gruppe of Jagdgeschwader 27 – Defense of the Reich — September 1943 – March 1944
—	6 September 1943	10:50	B-17	Karlsruhe/Stuttgart	Stab II./JG 27	89	7 January 1944	12:20	P-38	north of Saarbrücken	Stab II./JG 27
—	6 September 1943	11:00	B-17	south of Echterdingen	Stab II./JG 27	90	11 January 1944	12:25	B-24	southeast of Assen	Stab II./JG 27
85	6 September 1943	11:08	B-17	east of Geislingen (Note: There is more than one place in Germany called Geislingen; German Wikipedia has a fuller list. At least two are in Baden-Württemberg, which is where Schröer's other combats on 6 September 1943 took place. It may not be possible to determine which Geislingen this was.)	Stab II./JG 27	91	11 January 1944	13:30	B-17*	west of Almelo	Stab II./JG 27
86	14 October 1943	14:20	B-17*	Alzey	Stab II./JG 27	92	29 January 1944	11:02	B-17*	Sankt Wendel	Stab II./JG 27
87	29 November 1943	14:48	B-17	south-southwest of Bremen	Stab II./JG 27	93	25 February 1944	12:28	B-17	20 km (12 mi) northeast of Chiemsee	Stab II./JG 27
88	19 December 1943	12:38	B-17	Krimml	Stab II./JG 27	94	25 February 1944	12:31	B-17	Altötting	Stab II./JG 27
—	7 January 1944	12:07	P-38	north of Saarbrücken	Stab II./JG 27	95	3 March 1944	12:23	P-38	Magdeburg	Stab II./JG 27
– Claims with III. Gruppe of Jagdgeschwader 54 – Defense of the Reich — May 1944
96	24 May 1944	11:15	P-51	Berlin center	Stab III./JG 54	98	24 May 1944	11:45	B-17	Wittstock	Stab III./JG 54
97	24 May 1944	11:40	B-17	Wittstock	Stab III./JG 54						
– Claims with the Stab of Jagdgeschwader 3 "Udet" – Flying the Focke-Wulf Fw 190 — March 1945 – May 1945
103	11 March 1945	—	P-39		Stab JG 3 "Udet"	109	19 April 1945	—	Il-2		Stab JG 3 "Udet"
104	11 March 1945	—	Pe-2		Stab JG 3 "Udet"	110	19 April 1945	—	Yak-3		Stab JG 3 "Udet"
105	11 March 1945	—	Pe-2		Stab JG 3 "Udet"	111	24 April 1945	—	Yak-3		Stab JG 3 "Udet"
106	15 March 1945	—	P-39		Stab JG 3 "Udet"	112	24 April 1945	—	Yak-9		Stab JG 3 "Udet"
107	15 March 1945	—	La-5		Stab JG 3 "Udet"	113	26 April 1945	—	La-5		Stab JG 3 "Udet"
108	15 March 1945	—	Yak-3		Stab JG 3 "Udet"	114	26 April 1945	—	La-5		Stab JG 3 "Udet"
