= John G. Jackson =

John G. Jackson may refer to:

- John G. Jackson (politician) (1777–1825), U.S. Representative and federal judge from Virginia
- John G. Jackson (writer) (1907–1993), African-American cultural historian and writer

== See also ==
- John Jackson (disambiguation)
