= Jonathan Jackson =

Jonathan Jackson may refer to:

== Politicians ==
- Jonathan Jackson (Massachusetts politician) (1743–1810), American merchant, Continental Congressman for Massachusetts and political leader
- Jonathan Jackson (Illinois politician) (born 1966), American civil rights activist, businessman, professor, and U.S. Representative from Illinois

== Sportspeople ==
- Jonathan Jackson (linebacker) (born 1977), American football player
- Jonathan Jackson (defensive end) (born 1981), American football defensive end
- Jonathan Jackson (triple jumper) (born 1984), American triple jumper, 3rd at the 2007 NCAA Division I Outdoor Track and Field Championships

== Others ==
- Jonathan P. Jackson (1953–1970), brother of George Jackson and perpetrator of 1970 Marin County courthouse incident
- Jonathan Jackson (actor) (born 1982), began career as child actor on General Hospital

== See also ==
- Jon Jackson (disambiguation)
- John Jackson (disambiguation)
