= John Jackson =

John or Johnny Jackson may refer to:

== Entertainment ==
=== Art ===
- John Baptist Jackson (1701–1780), British artist
- John Jackson (painter) (1778–1831), British painter
- John Jackson (engraver) (1801–1848), English wood-engraver
- John Richardson Jackson (1819–1877), English engraver
- John Adams Jackson (1825–1879), American sculptor
- J. B. Jackson (1909–1996), writer and sketch artist in landscape design
- John Reno Jackson (born 1995), Caymanian artist

=== Music ===
- John Enderby Jackson (1827–1903), English musician and composer
- John Jackson (blues musician) (1924–2002), American Piedmont blues musician
- John Jackson (musician), guitarist for the Jayhawks
- Johnny Jackson (musician) (1955–2006), drummer with the Jackson 5
- John Jackson, legal name of rapper Fabolous

=== Other entertainment ===
- John Jackson (actor), English actor
- John Jackson (travel writer) (died 1807), British traveler and writer
- John G. Jackson (writer) (1907–1993), African-American cultural historian and writer
- J. J. Jackson (media personality) (1941–2004), American radio and television personality
- John M. Jackson (born 1950), American actor best known for playing the J.A.G. on JAG
- John E. Jackson (make-up artist), American make-up artist
- John Jackson (writer), English television writer

== Politics ==
=== U.K. ===
- John Jackson (Pontefract MP) (died 1637), English politician; MP 1624–1629
- Sir John Jackson, 1st Baronet (1763–1820), British businessman, MP for Dover and a baronet
- John Jackson (engineer) (1851–1919), British engineer and politician, MP for Plymouth Devonport, 1910–1918
- John Arthur Jackson (1862–1937), British Conservative Party politician
- John Jackson (South East Derbyshire MP) (1919–1976), British Conservative politician
- John Edward Jackson (diplomat) (1925–2002), British diplomat

=== U.S. ===
- John G. Jackson (politician) (1777–1825), Virginia politician and federal judge
- John Jackson (mayor) (1809–1887), mayor of Tampa, Florida
- John Jay Jackson Jr. (1824–1907), Virginia and West Virginia politician and federal judge
- John Jackson (Richmond politician) (1848–1910), member of the Virginia House of Delegates
- John B. Jackson (1862–1920), diplomat, US Ambassador to Serbia
- John Holmes Jackson (1871–1944), mayor of Burlington, Vermont
- John S. Jackson (Florida politician), mayor of Lakeland, Florida
- John S. Jackson (Wisconsin politician) (1874–1960), Wisconsin farmer and politician

=== Other political figures ===
- John Rawleigh Jackson (1780–?), planter, slave-owner and politician in Jamaica
- John Alexander Jackson (1809–1885), Colonial Treasurer of South Australia
- John Alexander Jackson (Tasmanian politician) (1844–1889), Attorney-General of Tasmania, 1872 to 1873
- John Robert Jackson (1859–1925), rancher and politician in British Columbia, Canada

== Religion ==
- John Jackson (minister) (1621–1693), English nonconformist
- John Jackson (military chaplain) (died 1717), Anglican priest and first chaplain to the garrison at St John's, Newfoundland
- John Jackson (controversialist) (1686–1763), English clergyman
- John Jackson (archdeacon of Clogher) (fl. 1762–1783)
- John Edward Jackson (antiquarian) (1805–1891), English cleric and archivist
- John Jackson (bishop) (1811–1885), bishop of Lincoln and of Bishop of London
- John Long Jackson (1884–1948), bishop of the Episcopal Diocese of Louisiana
- John Paul Jackson (1950–2015), American author, teacher, founder of Streams Ministries International

== Science ==
- John Hughlings Jackson (1835–1911), neurologist, namesake of Jacksonian seizure
- John Price Jackson (1868–1948), American electrical engineer and academic
- J. Wilfrid Jackson (1880–1978), British geologist and paleontologist
- John Jackson (astronomer) (1887–1958), Scottish astronomer
- John Meadows Jackson (1907–1998), British mathematician and physicist
- John S. Jackson (geologist) (1920–1991), Irish geologist
- John David Jackson (physicist) (1925–2016), Canadian–American physicist and author of a graduate textbook on electrodynamics
- John P. Jackson, American physicist and leading researcher on the Shroud of Turin

== Sports ==
=== American football ===
- John Jackson (offensive tackle) (born 1965), former NFL offensive tackle
- John Jackson (wide receiver) (born 1967), former NFL player
- Johnnie Jackson (American football) (born 1967), cornerback
- John Jackson (wide receiver, born 1999) (born 1999)

=== Association football ===
- John Jackson (football manager) (1861–1931), first manager of Brighton and Hove Albion
- John Jackson (footballer, born 1885) (1885–?), Scottish footballer (Clyde, Leeds City, Celtic, Dundee)
- John Jackson (footballer, born 1906) (1906–1965), Scottish football goalkeeper (Partick Thistle, Chelsea)
- John Jackson (footballer, born 1923) (1923–1992), English footballer for Stoke City
- John Jackson (footballer, born 1942) (1942–2022), English football goalkeeper for Crystal Palace

=== Baseball ===
- Bud Fowler (born John W. Jackson, 1858–1913), pioneer black baseball player and club organizer
- John Jackson (baseball) (1909–1956), Major League Baseball pitcher, 1933
- Big Train Jackson (John William Jackson Jr., born 1917), American baseball player

=== Boxing ===
- John Jackson (English boxer) (1769–1845)
- John David Jackson (boxer) (born 1963), former super welterweight boxer
- John Jackson (Virgin Islands boxer) (born 1989), Olympic boxer from the Virgin Islands

=== Cricket ===
- John Jackson (cricketer, born 1833) (1833–1901), English cricketer
- John Jackson (cricketer, born 1841) (1841–1906), English cricketer
- John Jackson (Worcestershire cricketer) (1880–1968), English cricketer
- John Jackson (cricketer, born 1898) (1898–1958), Chilean cricketer

=== Other sports ===
- John Jackson (jockey), British classic winning jockey
- John Jackson (sport shooter) (1885–1971), American Olympic sport shooter
- John Angelo Jackson (1921–2005), mountaineer
- John Jackson (athlete) (born 1941), British steeplechaser
- John Jackson (speedway rider) (born 1952), British speedway rider
- John Jackson (racing driver) (born 1964), professional racing driver
- J. D. Jackson (basketball) (born 1969), Canadian basketball coach and former player
- John Jackson (bobsleigh) (born 1977), British bobsledder and Royal Marines commando
- John Jackson (field hockey) (born 1986), Irish field hockey player

== Others ==
- John Mills Jackson (c. 1764–1836), Canadian author, merchant, and justice of the peace
- John K. Jackson (1828–1866), American lawyer and soldier
- John Andrew Jackson, American slave
- John Payne Jackson (1848–1915), Americo-Liberian journalist
- John Francis Jackson (1908–1942), Australian fighter ace of World War II
- John Jackson (trade unionist) (1919–1995), British trade union leader
- John Jackson (businessman) (born 1929), author and campaigner
- John Jackson (law professor) (1932–2015), American law professor at Georgetown University
- John L. Jackson Jr. (born 1971), professor and dean of the University of Pennsylvania School of Social Policy and Practice
- John Jackson (hacker) (born 1994 or 1995), security researcher

== See also ==
- Jackson (name)
