= Jon Jackson =

Jon Jackson may refer to:

- Jon Jackson (politician), candidate in United States House of Representatives elections, 2008
- Jon Jackson (figure skater) in 2002 Winter Olympics figure skating scandal

== See also ==
- Jonathan Jackson (disambiguation)
- John Jackson (disambiguation)
