= No. 75 Squadron RAAF =

Royal Australian Air Force squadron

- No. 75 Squadron's crest
- Active: 1942–1948; 1949–1954; 1955–current
- Branch: Royal Australian Air Force
- Role: Fighter
- Part of: No. 81 Wing, Air Combat Group
- Garrison/HQ: RAAF Base Tindal
- Mottos: Seek and Strike
- Engagements: World War II (1942–1945); Iraq War (2003); Military intervention against ISIL (2015)
- Decorations: Meritorious Unit Citation

Commanders
- Notable commanders: Peter Jeffrey (1942); John Jackson (1942); Les Jackson (1942–1943); Wilfred Arthur (1943); Melvin Hupfeld (2001–2003)

Aircraft flown
- Fighter: P-40 Kittyhawk (1942–1945); P-51 Mustang (1946–1948) de Havilland Vampire (1949–1954, 1955–1957); Gloster Meteor (1955–1957); CAC Sabre (1957–1965); Mirage III (1965–1988); F/A-18 Hornet (1988–2021); F-35A Lightning II (2021–current)
- Reconnaissance: F-4 Lightning (1943)
- Transport: GAF Nomad (1989–1993)

No. 75 Squadron is a Royal Australian Air Force (RAAF) fighter unit based at RAAF Base Tindal in the Northern Territory. The squadron was formed in 1942 and saw extensive action in the South West Pacific theatre of World War II, operating P-40 Kittyhawks. It was disbanded in 1948, but reformed the following year and operated jet aircraft throughout the Cold War. The squadron was based at Malta from 1952 to 1954, flying de Havilland Vampires, and Malaysia from 1968 to 1983, with Dassault Mirage IIIs, before returning to Australia.

The squadron was re-equipped with F/A-18 Hornet fighters and moved to RAAF Base Tindal in 1988. It was placed on alert to support the Australian-led INTERFET peacekeeping deployment to East Timor in 1999, and saw combat in 2003 as part of the Australian contribution to the invasion of Iraq and in 2015 during the military intervention against ISIL. The F/A-18s were retired in December 2021, and the squadron received its first F-35A Lightning IIs the same month.

== History ==
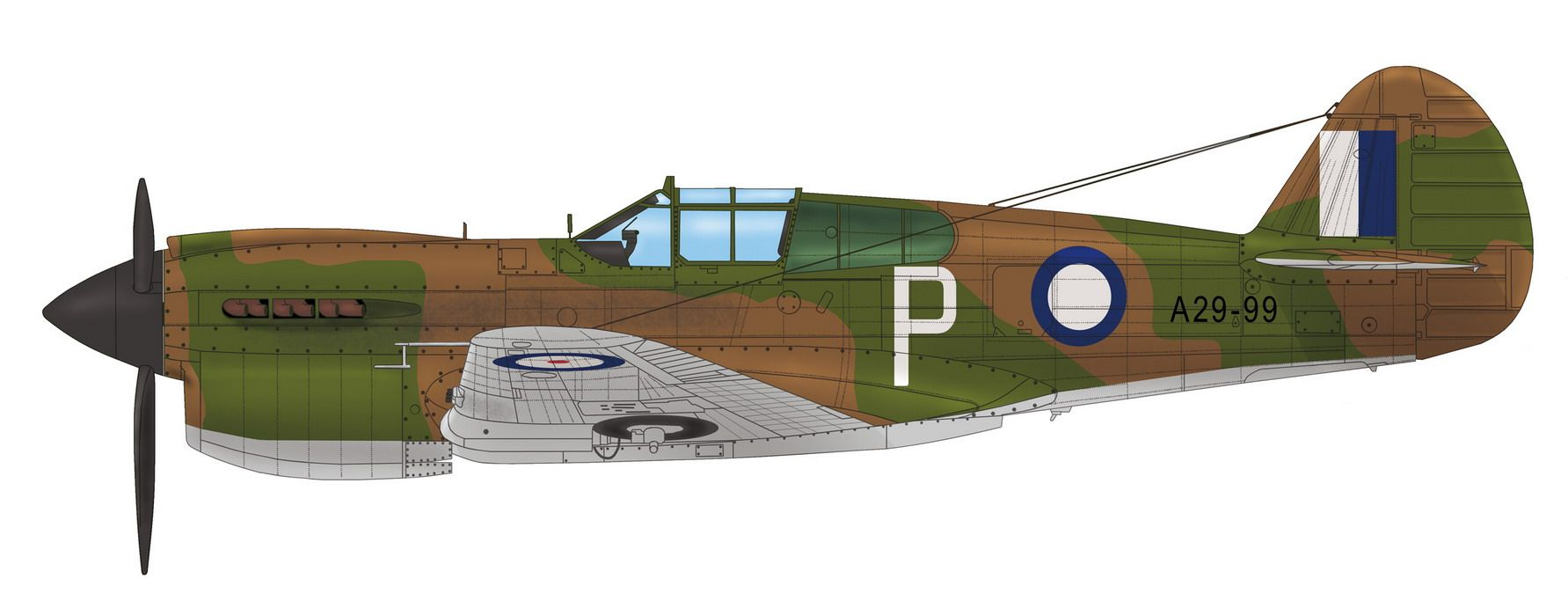
Curtiss Kittyhawk Mk IA of No. 75 Squadron RAAF, which Flying Officer Geoff Atherton flew over New Guinea in August 1942

=== Port Moresby and Milne Bay ===
In February and March 1942 the Allied position in New Guinea was under pressure and Japanese aircraft had been sighted over the Torres Strait Islands and Cape York in northern Australia. As a result, priority was given to basing a fighter squadron at Port Moresby in New Guinea to defend the town's important airfields and port facilities. The RAAF received an allocation of 25 P-40 Kittyhawk fighters in late February that were flown to Townsville, Queensland, and used to form No. 75 Squadron on 4 March 1942. The need to reinforce Port Moresby's defences was so pressing that the squadron was allowed only nine days to train with the aircraft before it deployed. Commanded initially by Squadron Leader Peter Jeffrey, No. 75 Squadron's advance party arrived in Port Moresby on 17 March and its aircraft followed between the 19th (when Squadron Leader John Jackson assumed command) and 21st of the month. At this time only four of the squadron's 21 pilots, including its commander, had previously seen combat.

No. 75 Squadron took part in the Battle of Port Moresby between March and April 1942. The squadron scored its first "kill" on the afternoon of 21 March when two Kittyhawks shot down a Japanese bomber which was conducting a reconnaissance of the town. On 22 March nine Kittyhawks attacked the Japanese airstrip at Lae, destroying 14 aircraft (including two during a dogfight) and damaging another five; two Australian aircraft were lost in this operation though another three crashed in separate accidents on 22 March. The Japanese launched a retaliatory raid on Port Moresby the next day. No. 75 Squadron was in action over Port Moresby or Lae almost every day during late March and April, and was generally outnumbered by Japanese aircraft. As well as mounting their own attacks on Japanese positions, the Kittyhawks also frequently escorted a squadron of United States Army Air Forces (USAAF) A-24 Banshee dive bombers, which were stationed at Port Moresby. No. 75 Squadron's casualties quickly mounted and were exacerbated by high rates of disease. Squadron Leader Jackson was shot down and killed on 28 April, shortly after he had destroyed a Japanese fighter. His younger brother Squadron Leader Les Jackson assumed command the next day. By the time two USAAF squadrons arrived to reinforce it on 30 April, No. 75 Squadron had been reduced to just three serviceable aircraft and a further seven Kittyhawks in need of repair. The squadron was withdrawn from operations on 3 May after losing two aircraft the day before. During its period at Port Moresby No. 75 Squadron was confirmed to have destroyed 35 Japanese aircraft, probably destroyed another four and damaged 44. The squadron suffered twelve fatalities and lost 22 Kittyhawks, including six in accidents.

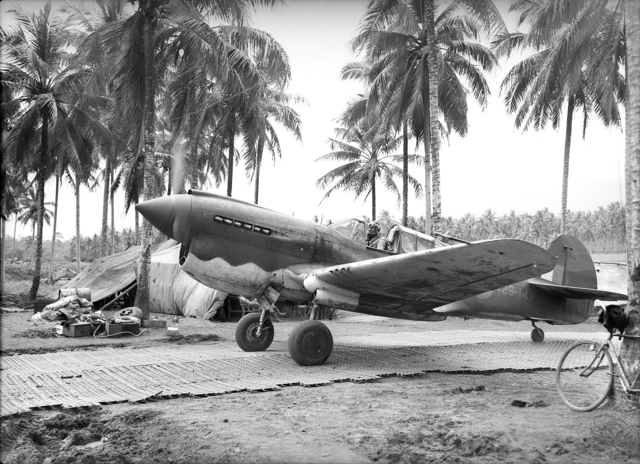
A No. 75 Squadron Kittyhawk at Milne Bay in September 1942

The squadron departed Port Moresby to return to Australia on 7 May 1942. It was first located at Townsville and later moved to Kingaroy followed by Lowood to be re-equipped. During this period it also received a number of pilots who had served in Supermarine Spitfire-equipped squadrons in Europe. In late July the unit departed Queensland and returned to New Guinea.

No. 75 Squadron arrived at Milne Bay on 31 July 1942 where it joined No. 76 Squadron, which was also equipped with Kittyhawks. At the time an Allied base was being developed at Milne Bay to both protect Port Moresby and mount attacks against Japanese positions in New Guinea and nearby islands. Japanese aircraft made their first major raid on Milne Bay on 11 August, which was intercepted by Kittyhawks from both No. 75 and No. 76 Squadrons. In mid-August the Milne Bay defenders were warned that they might be the target of a Japanese landing, and on 24 August Japanese barges were sighted heading for the area. These vessels were destroyed the next day on Goodenough Island by nine No. 75 Squadron Kittyhawks. However, on the night of 25/26 August another Japanese convoy landed an invasion force at Milne Bay. During the resulting Battle of Milne Bay the two Kittyhawk squadrons provided important support to the Allied defenders by heavily attacking Japanese positions and intercepting Japanese air raids on the area. On 28 August the Kittyhawks were withdrawn to Port Moresby when the Japanese troops came close to their airstrips, but they returned to Milne Bay the next day. No. 75 and No. 76 Squadrons later supported the Allied counter-offensive at Milne Bay which ended with the remaining Japanese troops being evacuated in early September. Following the battle Lieutenant General Sydney Rowell, the commander of New Guinea Force, stated that the attacks made by the two squadrons on the day of the Japanese landing were "the decisive factor" in the Allied victory. From 21 to 23 September No. 75 Squadron flew sorties in support of the 2/12th Battalion during the Battle of Goodenough Island.

In late September the two Australian squadrons at Milne Bay were relieved by two USAAF squadrons, and No. 75 Squadron was redeployed to Horn Island. It subsequently moved again to Cairns for a period of rest before returning to Milne Bay in February 1943, under the command of Squadron Leader Wilfred Arthur. During this deployment the squadron operated alongside No. 77 Squadron. No. 75 Squadron flew patrols over Milne Bay and Goodenough Island, and on 14 May a mixed force of 17 Kittyhawks from it and No. 77 Squadrons inflicted heavy casualties on a force of 65 Japanese aircraft bound for Milne Bay while only a single Australian aircraft was lost. This was No. 75 Squadron's last major air battle of the war. From August to December the squadron was issued with two F-4 Lightning aircraft for photo reconnaissance tasks. No. 75 Squadron moved to Goodenough Island in October 1943 to support the Allied offensive in the Louisiade Archipelago and New Britain.

=== Offensive operations ===
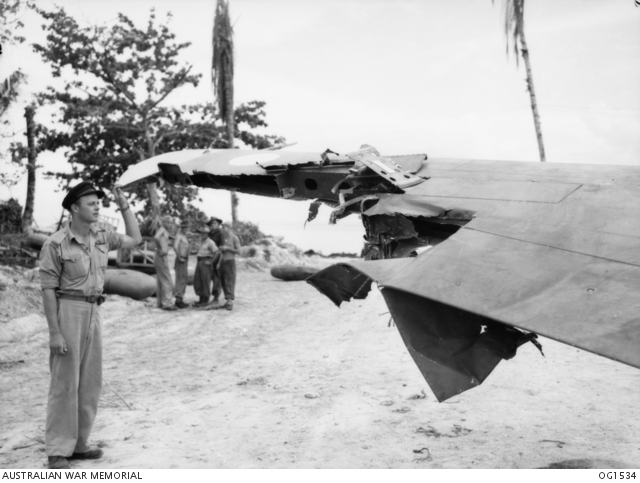
In 1944, Flying Officer T.R. Jacklin (pictured) flew this No. 75 Squadron P-40N-5 more than 200 mi (322 km) after losing the port aileron and 25% of its wing area to a direct hit from an artillery shell.

In December 1943 No. 75 Squadron became part of No. 78 Wing, which in turn formed part of the newly established No. 10 Operational Group. This group had been formed to provide a mobile organisation capable of supporting the offensives in and around New Guinea which were planned for 1944. During the first half of 1944 the squadron frequently moved between air bases to support Allied operations and was based at Nadzab from January to March, Cape Gloucester from March to May, Tadji in May, Hollandia from May to June and Biak from June to July. During this period its role was to provide close air support for Australian and US ground troops and protect Allied shipping from air attack. No. 75 Squadron was stationed at Noemfoor from July to November 1944 where it conducted long-range attacks on Japanese airstrips and shipping in the eastern islands of the Netherlands East Indies. No. 10 Operational Group was renamed the First Tactical Air Force (1TAF) on 25 October 1944; at this time No. 75 Squadron continued to form part of No. 78 Wing alongside No. 78 and No. 80 Squadrons. The squadron was ordered back to Biak by 1TAF on 2 November to provide air defence for the island, to the displeasure of the pilots who considered that they were "being taken out of the war". Only 149 sorties were flown from Biak before No. 75 Squadron returned to Noemfoor on 11 December.

No. 75 Squadron and the rest of No. 78 Wing moved to Morotai in the Netherlands East Indies in late December 1944. The squadron arrived at Morotai on 21 December and flew 147 operational sorties that month during attacks on Japanese positions in the nearby Halmahera islands. Attacks on Halmahera and other islands in the NEI continued in early 1945, and No. 75 Squadron also flew sorties in support of US troops who were attacking the remaining Japanese on Morotai. These and similar operations were seen as wasteful by many of 1TAF's fighter pilots and their leaders. On 20 April, eight officers including Wilf Arthur, now a group captain and No. 78 Wing's commander, attempted to resign in protest during the "Morotai Mutiny".

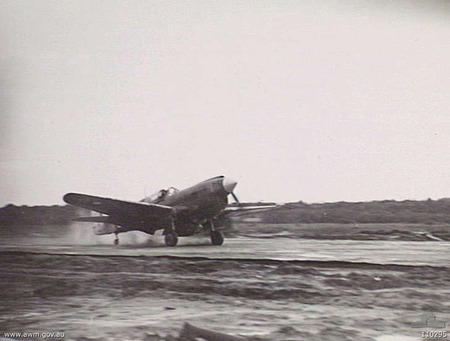
No. 75 Squadron's commander landing his Kittyhawk at Tarakan

From May 1945 No. 75 Squadron participated in the Borneo Campaign. While the squadron's ground crew landed on Tarakan with the invasion force in early May 1945, delays with repairing the island's airfield meant that its aircraft could not be deployed there until mid-July rather than 3 May as had been originally planned. During this period No. 75 Squadron's pilots remained at Morotai but conducted little flying, causing their morale to decline. Once established at Tarakan the Kittyhawks attacked targets near Sandakan and supported Australian forces during the Battle of Balikpapan in the war's last weeks.

Following the Japanese surrender No. 75 Squadron flew reconnaissance patrols over prisoner of war camps and continued general flying. The Kittyhawks were later flown to Oakey, Queensland and the ground crew returned to Australia in December 1945 on board the British aircraft carrier HMS Glory. The squadron suffered 42 fatalities during World War II.

=== Cold War ===
From December 1945 to May 1946 No. 75 Squadron was maintained as a cadre located at Deniliquin and manned by one officer and three airmen without any aircraft. In May 1946 the squadron moved to RAAF Station Schofields near Sydney, but was not issued with any aircraft or further personnel until it moved to RAAF Base Williamtown in September that year and was equipped with P-51 Mustang fighters. No. 75 Squadron used these aircraft for routine training and exercises until it was disbanded on 25 March 1948.

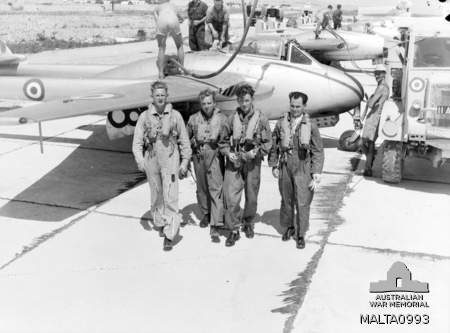
Four No. 75 Squadron pilots walking away from their Vampire fighters following an anti-shipping training exercise at Malta during July 1954

The squadron was re-formed at Williamtown on 24 January 1949 equipped with de Havilland Vampire jet fighters. From 1949 to early 1952 No. 75 Squadron conducted training exercises, which included teaching new pilots to operate Vampires, as well as making acceptance flights of Vampires delivered to the RAAF. During this period a key role for the squadron was training pilots for combat in the Korean War with the Gloster Meteor-equipped No. 77 Squadron. In March 1952 the Australian Government decided to reform No. 78 Wing and deploy it to Malta where it would form part of a British force which sought to counter the Soviet Union's influence in the Middle East. No. 75 and No. 76 Squadrons were selected to form the wing's flying units, and they arrived at RAF Hal Far in Malta during July 1952 and were equipped with Vampires leased from the Royal Air Force (RAF). While based at Malta the wing took part in numerous training exercises in the Mediterranean region as well as Europe, including a large-scale NATO exercise in 1953 which involved 2,000 aircraft and 40,000 personnel. In addition, the wing participated in a royal review to commemorate the coronation of Queen Elizabeth II. No. 78 Wing moved to the RAF station at Ta' Qali in June 1953 where it remained until it returned to Australia in late December 1954. In preparation for its return to Australia No. 75 Squadron was disbanded in November 1954.

No. 75 Squadron was reestablished at Williamtown in April 1955. It was initially equipped with Vampires and Gloster Meteor fighters, but these were replaced with CAC Sabre aircraft in early 1957. While operating Sabres the squadron made a number of deployments to Darwin for air defence exercises which often involved RAF units. On 8 December 1958 No. 75 Squadron transferred from No. 78 Wing to become an independent unit under the direct command of RAAF Base Williamtown. In November 1964 several of the squadron's pilots took part in an emergency deployment to Darwin when an Indonesian attack was feared as part of an apparent escalation of the Indonesia–Malaysia confrontation.

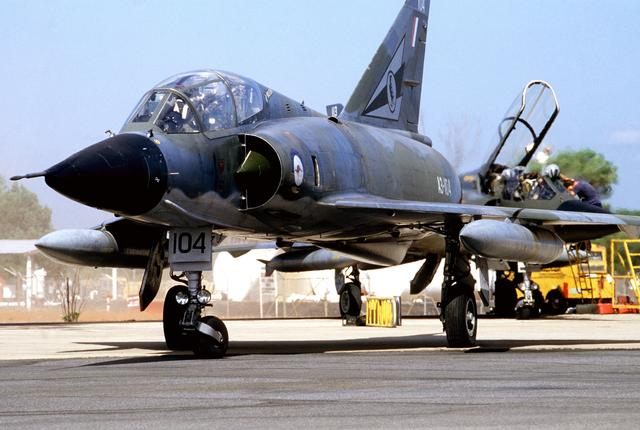
A No. 75 Squadron Mirage III in 1988

The squadron became the first Australian fighter unit to be equipped with Dassault Mirage III fighters in December 1964 and was declared operational with these aircraft on 1 August 1967. It subsequently maintained a detachment of Mirages at Darwin from 2 May 1966 until early 1967. Following a period of training No. 75 Squadron transferred to RAAF Base Butterworth in Malaysia during May 1967. From this base the squadron took part in regular exercises with the Royal Malaysian Air Force (RMAF), Royal New Zealand Air Force (RNZAF), Republic of Singapore Air Force (RSAF) and occasional exercises involving the RAF. No. 75 Squadron also trained with the United States Air Force and United States Navy on occasion, including the large-scale Cope Thunder series of exercises during which it deployed to Clark Air Base in the Philippines. Throughout its period based at Butterworth No. 75 Squadron deployed detachments of six Mirages to Tengah Air Base in Singapore on a rotational basis with No. 3 Squadron RAAF, with this responsibility swapping between the two units every three months.

In 1981 the Australian Government decided to withdraw a RAAF fighter squadron from Malaysia to Darwin pending the completion of RAAF Base Tindal near Katherine in the Northern Territory. No. 75 Squadron was the unit selected, and it arrived in Darwin in August 1983, becoming the first fighter squadron to be permanently based in the Northern Territory since World War II. The unit began to convert to F/A-18 Hornets in May 1988 and moved to Tindal in October that year. No. 75 Squadron also became part of No. 81 Wing during 1988. Tindal was close to the RAAF's newly developed Delamere Air Weapons Range and the squadron was assigned two GAF Nomad light transport aircraft between January 1989 and 1993 to fly supplies to the facilities there.

=== Current role ===
During late 1999 No. 75 Squadron was placed on alert to provide close air support and air defence to protect the international forces which had deployed to East Timor as part of INTERFET. However, despite the threat posed by Indonesian forces, ultimately they were not required.

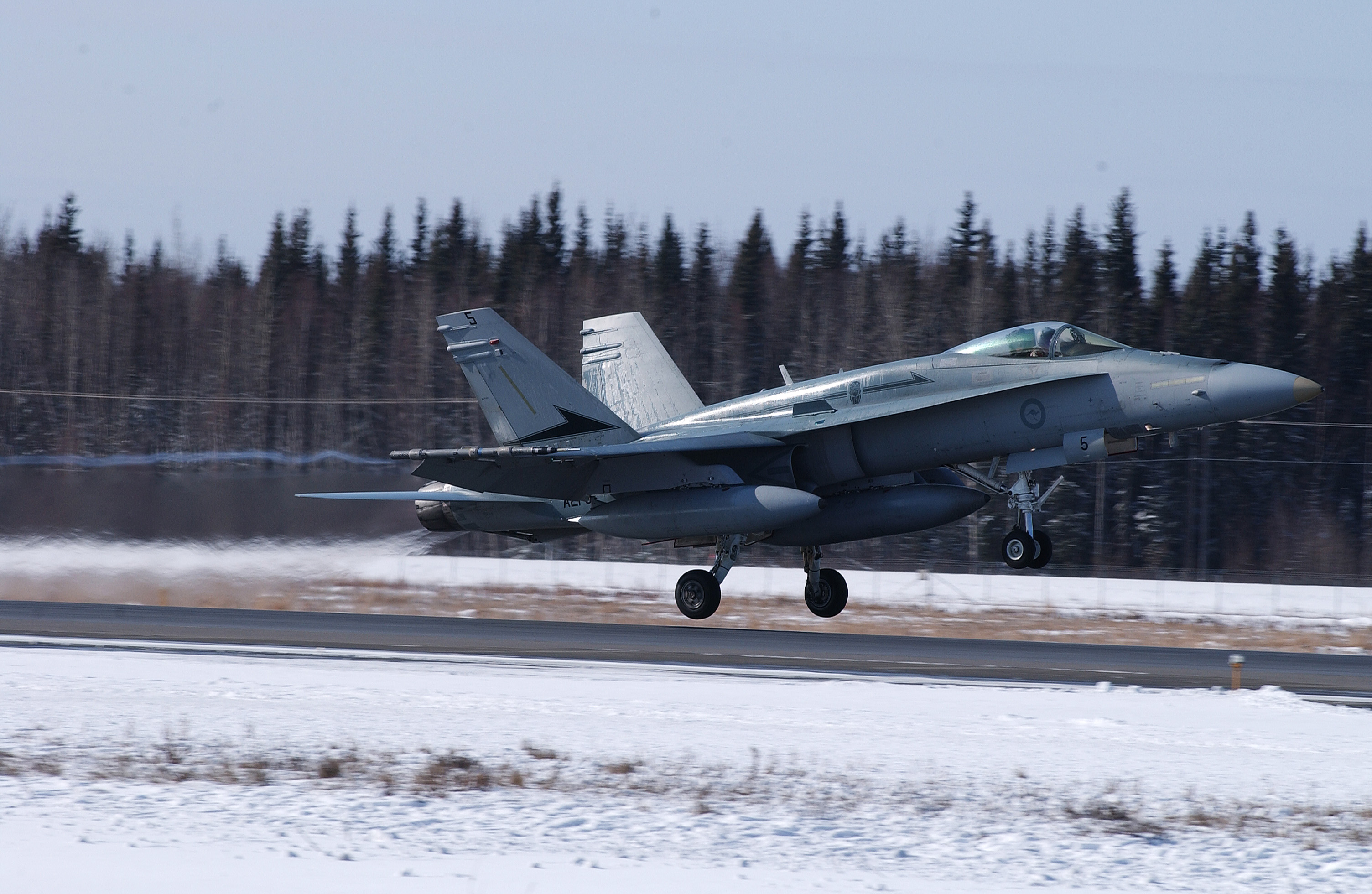
An F/A-18 Hornet assigned to No. 75 Squadron during a deployment to Alaska in April 2008. The plane is marked with the tail flag of No. 77 Squadron.

No. 75 Squadron saw action for the first time since 1945 as part of the Australian contribution to the 2003 invasion of Iraq. The Australian Government announced that it would deploy a squadron of F/A-18s to the Middle East on 1 February 2003 and 14 No. 75 Squadron Hornets flew from Tindal to Al Udeid Air Base in Qatar via Diego Garcia between 13 and 16 February. Following the outbreak of the Iraq War on 20 March the squadron was initially used to escort high-value Coalition aircraft such as tankers and E-3 Sentry aircraft. As it became clear that the Iraqi Air Force posed no threat, the role of No. 75 Squadron shifted to providing close air support to Coalition ground forces and air interdiction against Iraqi forces. These missions were initially flown in support of the US Army but the squadron was later switched to supporting the US Marine Corps. The squadron also supported the Australian Special Air Service Regiment and 4th Battalion, Royal Australian Regiment on 12 April when these units captured Al Asad Airbase. No. 75 Squadron flew its last combat sortie on 27 April. During the war the squadron flew 350 combat missions and dropped 122 laser-guided bombs. During these operations the squadron was augmented with pilots from No. 81 Wing's other F/A-18 squadrons. No. 75 Squadron's aircraft returned to Tindal on 14 May 2003 and its ground crew arrived there the next day. The squadron was awarded a Meritorious Unit Citation on 27 November 2003 for "sustained outstanding service during warlike operations, in the Middle East Area of operations, over Iraq during Operation Falconer".

In August 2005, a group of current and veteran members of No. 75 Squadron travelled to Papua New Guinea to commemorate the 60th anniversary of the end of the Pacific War, and the 63rd anniversary of the Battle of Milne Bay. As at 2011, No. 75 Squadron was the RAAF's largest F/A-18-equipped unit. The squadron regularly exercised with units from the RMAF, RNZAF, RSAF and US Military and conducted training using the facilities of the Delamere Air Weapons Range. As of 2014, No. 75 Squadron was scheduled to transition to Lockheed Martin F-35A Lightning II fighters from late 2021.

In March 2015, six F/A-18As from No. 75 Squadron deployed to the Middle East during Operation Okra as part of the military intervention against ISIL. The aircraft replaced a detachment of six F/A-18F Super Hornets from No. 1 Squadron, and began flying combat operations late that month. The squadron was deployed to the Middle East until September 2015, when it handed over to the next rotation from No. 77 Squadron.

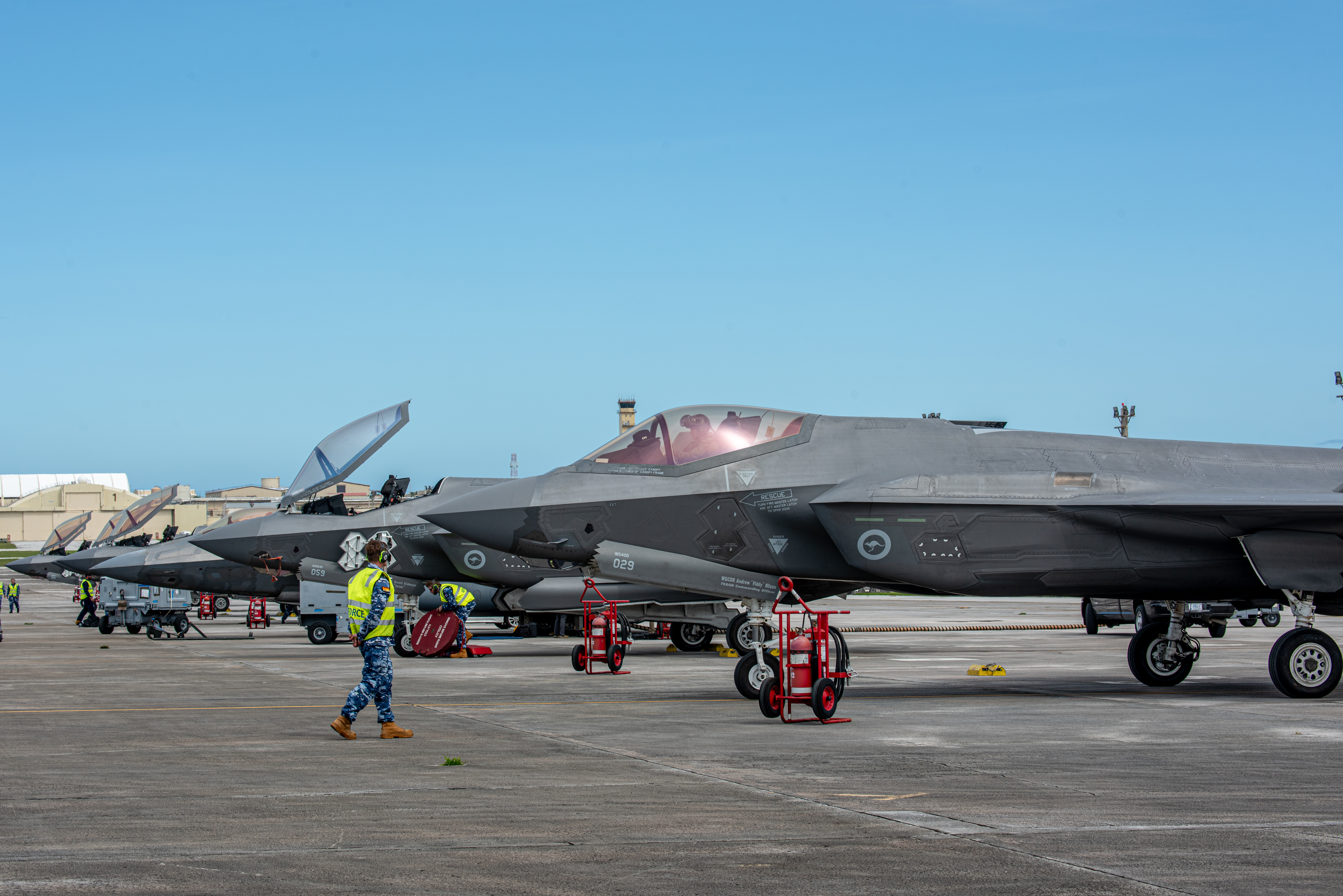
No. 75 Squadron F-35A Lightnings in 2025

No. 75 Squadron was awarded the 2019 RAAF Maintenance Trophy for its performance maintaining the ageing F/A-18As. It was the last RAAF unit to operate the F/A-18A, which made its final flight on 4 December 2021. The squadron received its first F-35A Lightnings five days later. It commemorated its 80th anniversary in June 2022 with, among other events, an F-35 flying display.

== See also ==
- McDonnell Douglas F/A-18 Hornet in Australian service
