= John Jackson (actor) =

English actor, manager, and dramatist

- Occupations: Actor manager, and dramatist

John Jackson (fl. 1761–1792) was an English actor, manager, and dramatist.

== Biography ==
Jackson was the son of a clergyman who held livings at Keighley, Doncaster (?), and Beenham in Berkshire. He was born in 1742, and was educated for the church. On 9 January 1761 (according to Biog. Dram. on 9 October 1762, as ‘a gentleman’) he appeared at the Theatre Royal, Edinburgh, as Oroonoko. During the season he played Romeo, Osmyn in the ‘Mourning Bride,’ Jaffier, Douglas, Hamlet, Prospero, &c. Having given offence to George Anne Bellamy, he left the following season for London, and appeared at Drury Lane under Garrick, 7 October 1762, as Oroonoko. He remained at this house two or three years, playing Lord Guilford Dudley in ‘Lady Jane Gray,’ Moneses in ‘Tamerlane,’ Southampton in ‘Earl of Essex,’ Sir Richard Vernon in the ‘First Part of King Henry IV,’ Polydore in ‘The Orphan,’ Lysimachus in the ‘Rival Queens,’ &c. About 1765 he was playing at Smock Alley Theatre, Dublin, where he married Miss Browne, the daughter of an actor in the same theatre. She was a pleasing singer, and was ‘possessed of much merit both in tragedy and comedy’ (Hitchcock). At Dublin the pair remained for several seasons, playing very many leading characters. On 7 July 1775 Jackson was at the Haymarket the original Eldred Durvy in his own tragedy of ‘Eldred, or the British Freeholder,’ which had been previously given in Dublin. His wife, announced as ‘from Dublin,’ played the heroine. As Juliet, Mrs. Jackson made her first appearance at Covent Garden on 25 September 1775. For her benefit, 1 May 1776, ‘Eldred’ was given here, with Jackson as Eldred Durvy. In the two following seasons she frequently appears to have assumed characters of importance, Juliet, Mariana in ‘Edward the Black Prince,’ Cordelia, &c., Jackson being rarely heard of except on the occasion of her benefits. On 9 June 1777 he, however, played Tony Lumpkin at the Haymarket.

On 10 November 1781, Jackson, according to his own account, purchased the Edinburgh theatre on advantageous terms from David Ross, a former manager. Bringing his wife with him, he began his management with the ‘Suspicious Husband,’ 1 December 1761. About the middle of January 1782 he opened a new theatre which he had built in Dunlop Street, Glasgow, and this he managed together with that at Edinburgh. He seldom played himself; engaged Miss Farren, Mrs. Siddons, Henderson, &c., and seems for some years to have been a fairly good manager. His engagement of James Fennell led to a curious quarrel with the Edinburgh lawyers. In 1790–1 he fell into pecuniary difficulties, ‘took out sequestration,’ and put his estate into the hands of trustees. His failure seems mainly due to his efforts to work together the theatres of Edinburgh, Glasgow, Dundee, and Aberdeen. A partnership with Stephen Kemble was arranged, and led to prolonged litigation, Jackson during 1791–2 being refused admittance into his own theatre. In 1801–2 Jackson was again manager in conjunction with a Mr. Aickin. Under his management Henry West Betty appeared in 1804, and Jackson published a pamphlet in his defence entitled ‘Strictures upon the Merits of Young Roscius,’ Glasgow, 1804, 8vo. In 1809 Jackson finally retired from management.

During his management he had produced his own tragedy of ‘Eldred’ (Edinburgh, 1782), a work of some merit, the authorship of which was, however, frequently claimed for a Welsh clergyman, who was said to have given it to Jackson. ‘The British Heroine,’ an unprinted tragedy by him, was given at Covent Garden for the benefit of Mrs. Jackson, 5 May 1778. It had been seen under the title of ‘Giralda, or the Siege of Harlech,’ in Dublin a year previously. On the same occasion was given at Covent Garden ‘Tony Lumpkin's Ramble,’ a piece not assigned to Jackson by theatrical authorities, but claimed by him when he produced it, 26 July 1780, in Edinburgh, with the title ‘Tony Lumpkin's Rambles through Edinburgh.’ ‘Sir William Wallace of Ellerslie, or the Siege of Dumbarton Castle,’ a tragedy by him, also unprinted, was acted in Edinburgh without success. In addition to these works, Jackson wrote ‘The History of the Scottish Stage,’ Edinburgh, 1793, a species of apologia, a work of no merit and little authority, incorporating a previously published ‘statement of facts explanatory of’ Jackson's dispute with Stephen Kemble, 8vo, 1792. Jackson was eaten up with vanity. He had a good person and some judgment, but was an indifferent performer, having a harsh voice and a provincial accent. Churchill, in ‘The Rosciad,’ speaks of him with much severity. His death cannot be traced.
