= John Jackson (travel writer) =

- Died: 1807
- Occupations: Travel writer; merchant
- Writing career
- Genre: Travel literature
- Notable work: Journey from India towards England in the year 1799 (1799)

John Jackson (died 1807) was a British traveller and writer.

== Life ==
Jackson was a wine merchant of the Vintners' Company, at 31 Clement's Lane, City of London by 1785. He travelled to India on business; and on 4 May 1797 left Bombay by country ship for Bassora on his way home. He went by way of the River Euphrates and River Tigris to Baghdad. His route then took him through Kurdistan, Anatolia, Bulgaria, Wallachia, and Transylvania. He reached Hamburg on 28 October 1797.

Jackson was elected Fellow of the Society of Antiquaries of London on 2 February 1804. He died in 1807.

== Works ==
Jackson published:

- Journey from India towards England …, London, 1799. In it he argued that the route he had followed was practicable all the year round.
- Reflections on the Commerce of the Mediterranean, deduced from actual experience during a residence on both shores of the Mediterranean Sea ... showing the advantages of increasing the number of British Consuls, and of holding possession of Malta as nearly equal to our West Indian trade, London, 1804.

In 1803 he communicated to the Society of Antiquaries an account of excavations made under his directions among the ruins of Carthage and Udena, published in Archæologia, vol. xv., 1806.

== Notes ==
Attribution

This article incorporates text from a publication now in the public domain: Lee, Sidney, ed. (1892). "Jackson, John (d.1807)". Dictionary of National Biography. Vol. 29. London: Smith, Elder & Co.
