= Geislingen =

Geislingen may refer to two towns in Baden-Württemberg, Germany:

- Geislingen an der Steige, district of Göppingen
- Geislingen, Zollernalbkreis, Zollernalbkreis district
