= James Fennell =

English actor and dramatist

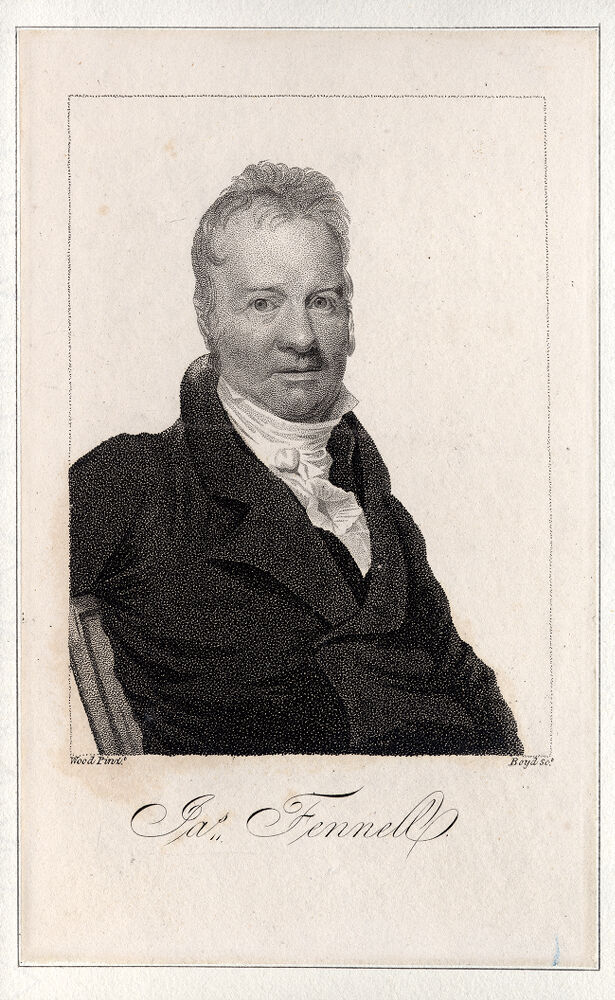
- Born: 11 December 1766; London
- Died: 14 June 1816 (aged 49); Philadelphia
- Years active: 1787–1815
- Spouse: Miss H. B. Porter

James Fennell (1766 – 1816) was an English actor and dramatist.

== Early life ==
Fennell was born 11 December 1766. His father was in the treasury department of the navy pay office. He went first to school at Bow under the Rev. Dr. French, and subsequently to Eton College. After a trip to France he entered Trinity College, Cambridge. His life at the university was extravagant. Abandoning an idea of taking orders he entered Lincoln's Inn.

== Stage career ==
In consequence of gambling debts he mortgaged to his father the money to which he was entitled, and when no further allowance could be obtained went to Edinburgh, June 1787, with a view to adopting the stage as a profession. Jackson, manager of the Theatre Royal, Edinburgh, engaged him as an amateur. His first appearance, under the name of Cambray, from the resemblance of his own name to Fénelon, was as Othello. He played six times in Edinburgh with some success, and accepted an engagement for the following season.

Returning to London, he appeared at Covent Garden Theatre 12 October 1787 as Othello, and acted in other plays. Harris, the manager, offered to engage him and pay his forfeit (£200) to Jackson, but he returned to Edinburgh in time for the season of 1788. He worked diligently and conscientiously. He was to play Jaffier in Venice Preserv'd, the part of Pierre being assigned to an actor named Woods. A proposal that the parts should be exchanged led to a riot in the theatre and a bitter controversy, Fennell offering at one point to reveal a 'scene of villainy.' The Edinburgh lawyers took part against him, and addressed a letter to the manager (15 July 1788) signed by Henry Erskine (dean of faculty), and 182 advocates and writers. Fennell began an action against his persecutors, but ultimately consented to a compromise. He received £500, and his adversaries agreed to take tickets for a benefit. They also invited him to show himself once more on the stage. He appeared accordingly as Othello. He gave one more performance in Edinburgh and went to London. He played Othello 25 Aug. at York, and was, says his employer, Tate Wilkinson, 'well received'. Three days later he enacted Don Felix to the Violente of Elizabeth Farren.

Upon his arrival in London he was arrested for debt. He was still helped by his father, who with other members of his family had disowned him when he took to the stage. He then acted at Richmond. He devoted himself in London to literary and scientific schemes. He had reappeared at Covent Garden 16 October 1790 as Othello, and played there in the following season. In 1792 he married Miss H. B. Porter, third daughter of Dr. Porter.

== In America ==
In 1793 he accepted an offer from Wignell, manager of the Philadelphia Theatre, and started for America. Between 1797 and 1806 he acted at many theatres in New York, Boston, and elsewhere without establishing a position. He gave readings and recitations at College Hall, Philadelphia, and for a time kept an academy at Charlestown, Massachusetts.

In 1814 he established salt-works near New London, Connecticut, and sometimes, in intervals of other occupations, resorted to manual labour. He also tried to establish in Philadelphia a school similar to Eton or Westminster. William Dunlap in his History of the American Theatres, pp. 231–3, and elsewhere, says he was a remarkably handsome man, over six feet in height, with light complexion and hair, and light grey eyes. Dunlap declares that he never paid his bills in Paris or Philadelphia, that he lived by fraud, and passed his life between a palace and a prison. He had been in 1794 the idol of the literary youth of Philadelphia.

== Death ==
In 1815, at the Chestnut Street Theatre, Philadelphia, he was allowed to attempt Lear, but his memory was gone. He died 14 June 1816. The picture affixed to his 'Apology' shows a handsome but rather narrow head. Wherever he went he made friends. In Edinburgh, Home, the author of Douglas, Henry Mackenzie, author of The Man of Feeling, and other literary men consorted with him.

== Works ==
He is said to have edited the Theatrical Guardian, of which six weekly numbers are believed to have appeared in London, March and April 1791. While at Richmond he brought out his Linda and Clara, or the British Officer, a comedy in three acts, subsequently enlarged to five, and published London, 1791.

A trip to Paris in 1791 led to the publication of A Review of the Proceedings at Paris during the last Summer, London, n.d. [1792]. He refers to a play entitled a 'Picture of Paris,’ which was acted once. Of this no trace is discoverable.

He wrote some verse epistles, one of them printed, and composed an 'Apology' for his life, Philadelphia, 1814. In a preface to this he represents himself struggling with want, and dedicates it to Mimosa Sensitiva, apparently his wife, of whom and his 'drooping family' he speaks. He resided some time with James Bruce, the African traveller, and claimed to have assisted him in his Travels.
