= Big Train Jackson =

American baseball player

- Pitcher
- Born: 1917; Louisiana, U.S.
- Died: Unknown
- Batted: Left Threw: Left

Negro league baseball debut
- 1938, for the Kansas City Monarchs

Last appearance
- 1940, for the Memphis Red Sox

NAL statistics
- Win–loss record: 4–7
- Earned run average: 5.69
- Strikeouts: 42
- Stats at Baseball Reference

Teams
- Kansas City Monarchs (1938–1939); Memphis Red Sox (1940)

John William Jackson Jr. (born 1917), nicknamed "Big Train", was an American Negro league baseball pitcher who played between 1938 and 1940.

A native of Louisiana, Jackson made his Negro leagues debut in 1938 with the Kansas City Monarchs, and played with the Monarchs again the following season. He finished his career in 1940 with the Memphis Red Sox.
