= Battle of Port Moresby =

1942 battle in Papua during WWII

Coordinates: 09°28′53.57″S 147°11′24.87″E

Battle of Port Moresby (Air)
- Part of the Pacific War, World War II
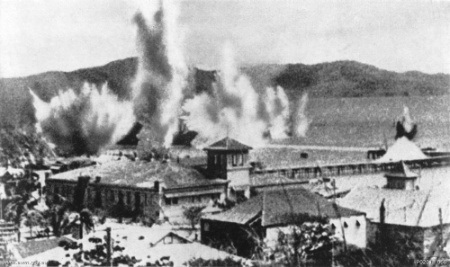
- Bombs explode in Port Moresby's harbour during one of the first Japanese air raids on the town in 1942
Date	3 February 1942 – 17 August 1943
Location	Port Moresby airspace, Territory of Papua
Result	Allied victory

Belligerents
Australia; United States	Japan

Units involved
No. 75 Squadron RAAF 30th Brigade (Australia) 23rd Heavy Anti-Aircraft Battery	

Casualties and losses
At least 22 P40 Fighters	35 Aircraft destroyed 44 Damaged

The Battle of Port Moresby was an aerial battle fought between the Royal Australian Air Force (RAAF) and United States Army Air Force (USAAF) on one side and the Imperial Japanese Army and Imperial Japanese Navy on the other between 3 February 1942 and 17 August 1943 over Port Moresby, Papua. At the start, the defenders consisted only of Australian Army anti-aircraft batteries and machine-guns, but by late March had been strengthened by the arrival of Kittyhawk fighters from No. 75 Squadron RAAF. However, in just nine days they lost 11 aircraft and only the arrival of replacements enabled the unit to maintain ten serviceable machines.

According to the Australian government:

On 31 March, the Australians were joined by the American 8th Bombardment Squadron with A-24 bombers and for two weeks in May by six P-39 Airacobras of the American 36th Pursuit Squadron. Despite the American assistance, the daily air battles over and around Port Moresby by 1 May had reduced No. 75 Squadron RAAF to just three airworthy machines. The American 35th, and the full 36th, Pursuit Squadrons arrived to relieve the Australian squadron. During their time in Port Moresby 75 Squadron had lost 21 aircraft and 12 pilots. The Battle of the Coral Sea, which was fought mostly in the waters south-east of Papua in early May, diverted a Japanese naval attack against Port Moresby and removed the immediate threat. However, by May 1942 the Japanese had established themselves in the arc of islands north and east of the island of New Guinea as well as in the region around Lae and Madang on the north coast of the mainland.
