= Gili Gili =

Village in Milne Bay Province, Papua New Guinea

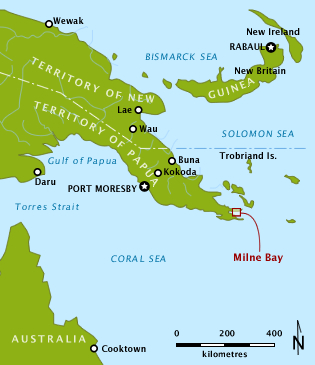
Gili Gili is in Milne Bay, supported by the Naval Base Milne Bay

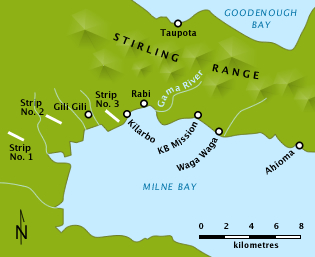
Enlargement of Milne Bay, indicating Gili Gili location

Gili Gili is a village in Milne Bay Province, Papua New Guinea. The village is located between Swinger Bay-Alotau to the east and Ladava to the west in Milne Bay north shore.

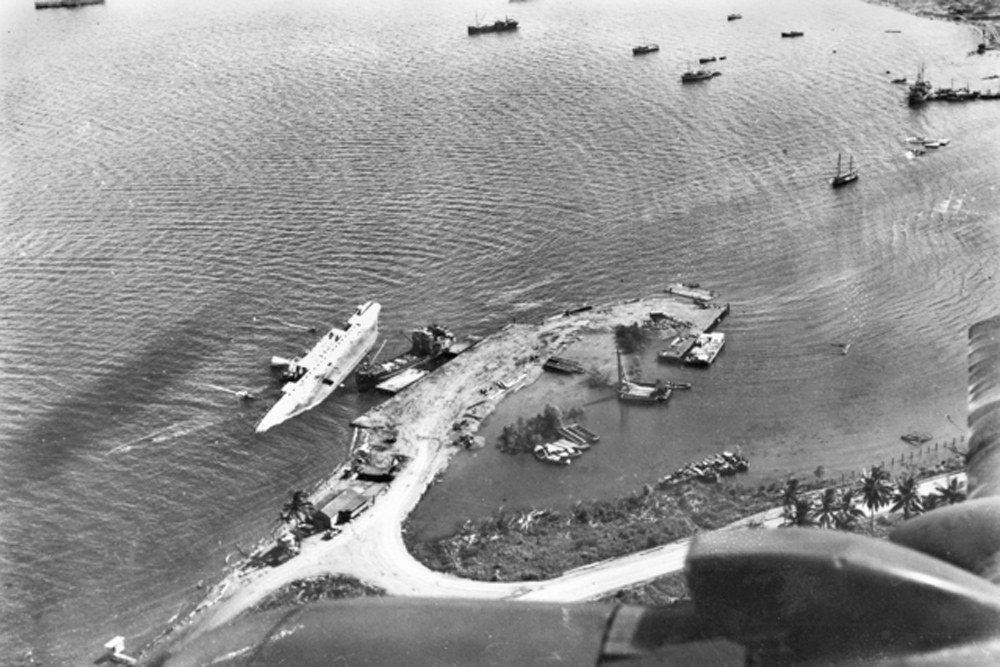
MV Anshun lying on her side at Gili Gili Dock, in Milne Bay, New Guinea, 1942

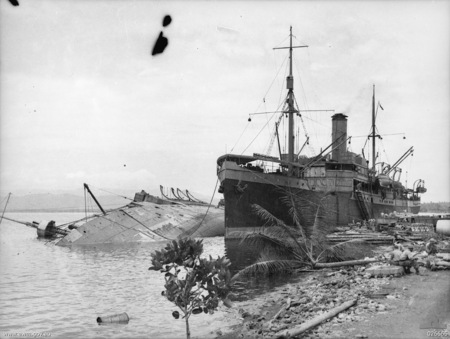
MV Anshun lying on her side at Gili Gili Dock, in Milne Bay, New Guinea, 1942

== Gili Gili Dock ==
Gili Gili Dock was a naval loading and unloading dock, with both a jetty and pontoon wharf at Gili Gili (also spelled Gill Gill). Both the Australian Armed Forces (HMAS Ladava) and United States Navy (Naval Base Milne Bay) used the dock. On September 6, 1942, the MV Anshun was sunk at Gili Gili Dock by the Japanese cruiser Tenryū. She was refloated and repaired.

Gili Gili Base was at 10.316694°S 150.380899°E, just west of Swinger Bay and the Swinger Bay Base. Turnbull Field No. 3 Strip was inland from the Gili Gili Dock and Swinger Bay Base amphibious training center just to the east of Gili Gili Dock. Gili Gili also became a U.S. Army staging area with a large tent camp.

== See also ==
- U.S. Naval Base Subic Bay
- Espiritu Santo Naval Base
- US Naval Advance Bases
- Battle of Milne Bay order of battle
