= Gama River =

Place in Milne Bay Province

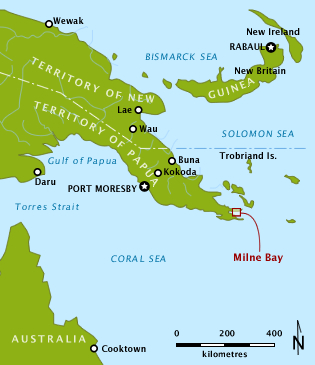
Gama River flows into Milne Bay

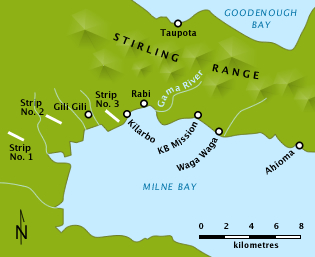
Enlargement of Milne Bay, indicating location of Gama River

The Gama River is a river located in Milne Bay Province of Papua New Guinea. Gama River flows into the Swinger Bay of Milne Bay. Water was used during World War II by HMAS Ladava and Naval Base Milne Bay

== See also ==
- Geography of Milne Bay Province
