= HMAS Ladava (naval base) =

Former Australian naval base

- Milne Bay in Papua New Guinea

Site information
- Type: Naval base
- Operator: Royal Australian Navy

Location
- Coordinates: 10.329891°S 150.351865°E

Site history
- Fate: Decommissioned
- Battles/wars: Pacific War of World War II; Battle of Milne Bay

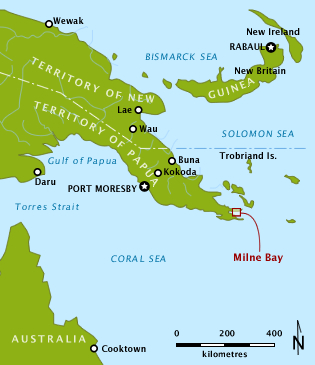
Location of Milne Bay within Territory of Papua, 1942. The highlighted area is enlarged below.

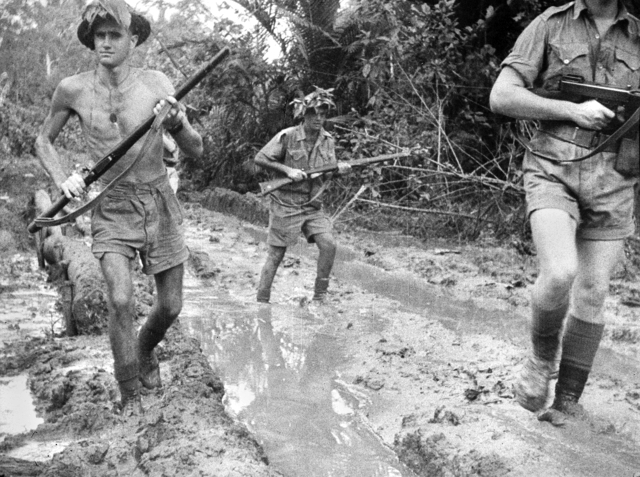
Australian troops at Milne Bay in 1942, shortly after the Battle of Milne Bay

HMAS Ladava is a former Royal Australian Navy (RAN) base that was located at Milne Bay in Papua New Guinea.

The Australian armed forces operated a number of bases in Milne Bay during World War II. Australians were able to defend and keep Milne Bay in the Battle of Milne Bay in 1942. Some bases: Rabi Camp (also spelled Rabe) was attacked by Japan in 1942. Rabi Camp was on the north shore in Swinger Bay at 10.297247°S 150.409053°E. KB Mission camp (Koebule Mission) was on the north shore east of Rabi Camp at 10.308442°S 150.432485°E, in the city of Alotau. Waga Waga Camp was at 10.415072°S 150.411784°E, on the south shore. At Konibirrubirru Island was an Australian Wireless Spotters Station. Main camp was at HMAS Ladava. Later the US Navy built Naval Base Milne Bay nearby and in some of HMAS Ladava camps.

== Kana Kopa Base ==
Kana Kopa (Kana Kope) is on the south side and near the entrance of Milne Bay at 10.483929°S 150.651824°E. Kana Kopa was used as anchorage for the Royal Australian Navy starting in 1942 and supported the August 1942 Battle of Milne Bay.

== Airfields ==
- Gurney Airfield (No. 1 Strip) at Milne Bay, is now Gurney Airport at 10°18′41″S 150°20′01″E.
- Turnbull Field (No. 3 Strip) was built in 1942 and is located near Gil Gili, just west of Swinger Bay. Now Memorial Park- No. 3 Airstrip at 10.302383°S 150.388901°E.
- Waigani Airfield, No. 2 Strip was built near Waigani on the west end of Milne Bay. Due to poor water drainage, the airfield was abandoned and not used. Airfield was at 10.316667°S 150.25°E.

== Gallery ==
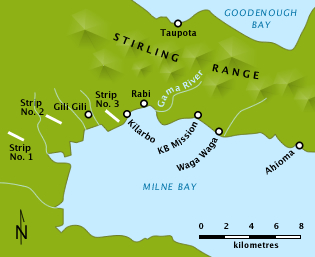
Area Milne Bay Bases in 1942

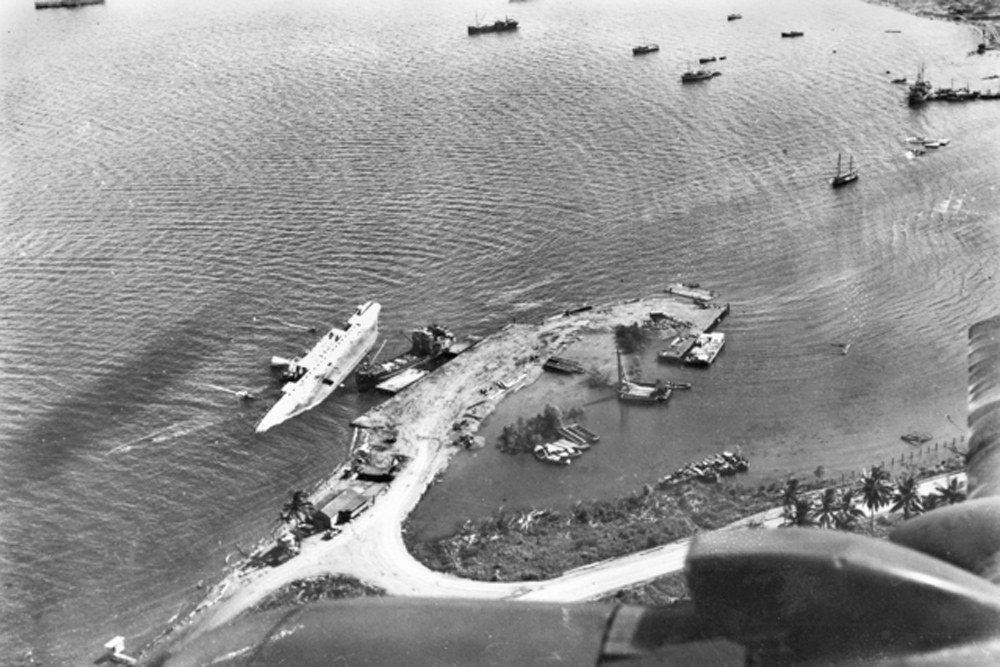
MV Anshun lying on her side at Gili Gili Dock, in Milne Bay, New Guinea, 1942

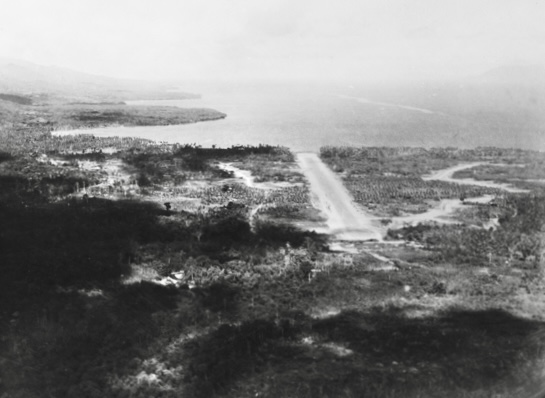
No 3 Strip and Stephens Ridge at Milne Bay

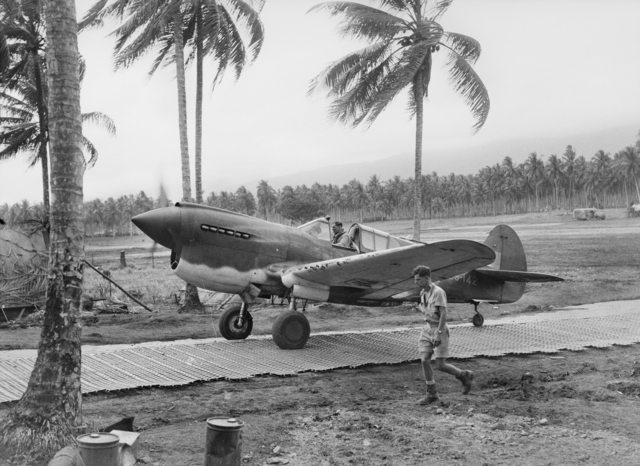
An Australian P-40 at Milne Bay

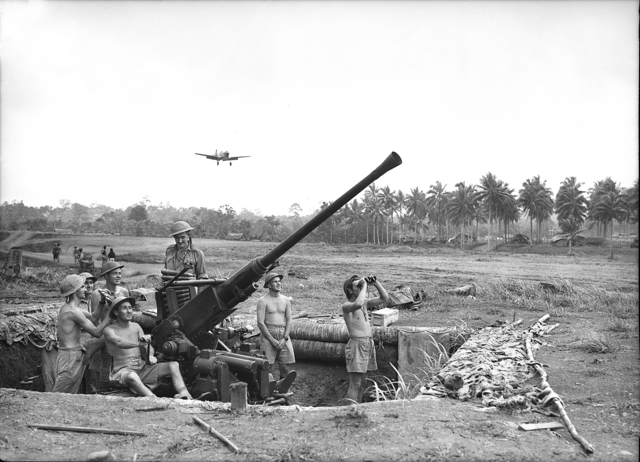
An Australian Bofors 40 mm anti-aircraft gun of the 2/9th Light Anti-Aircraft Battery at Milne Bay No. 1 Airstrip

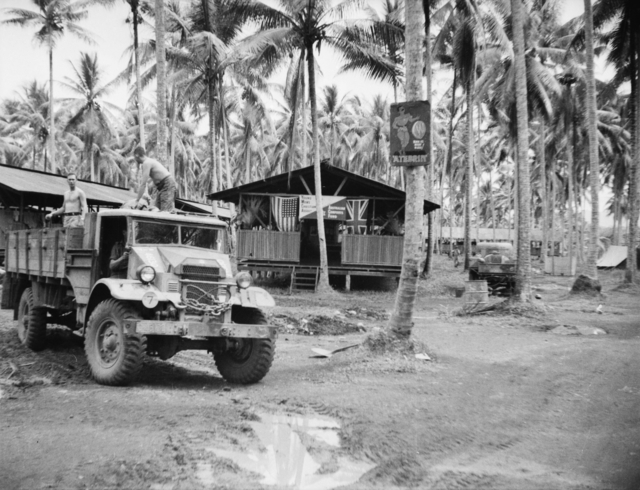
Australian camp at Milne Bay

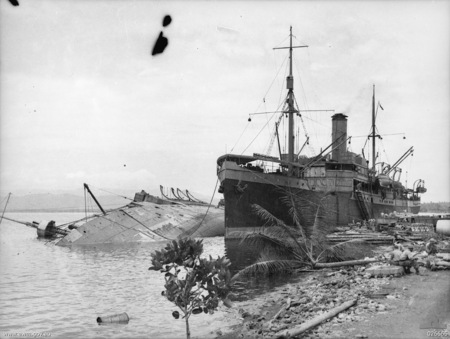
MV Anshun lying on her side at Gili Gili Dock, in Milne Bay, New Guinea, 1942

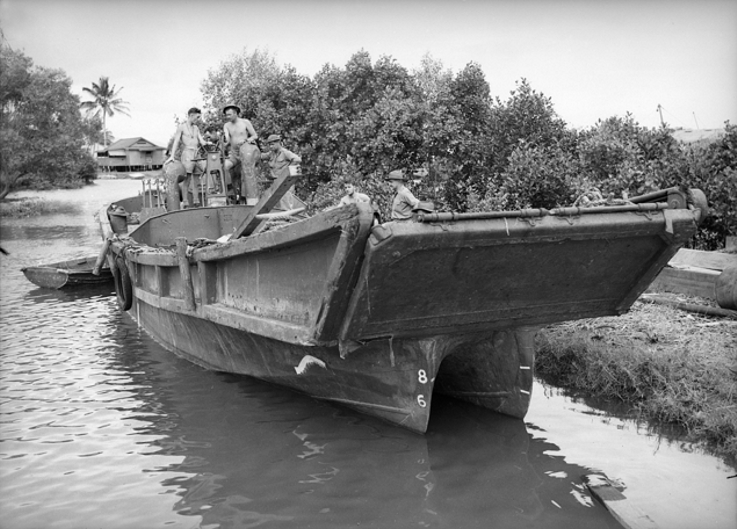
One of the Japanese barges after the battle. The fluted bottom allows the barge to retract from the beach easily.

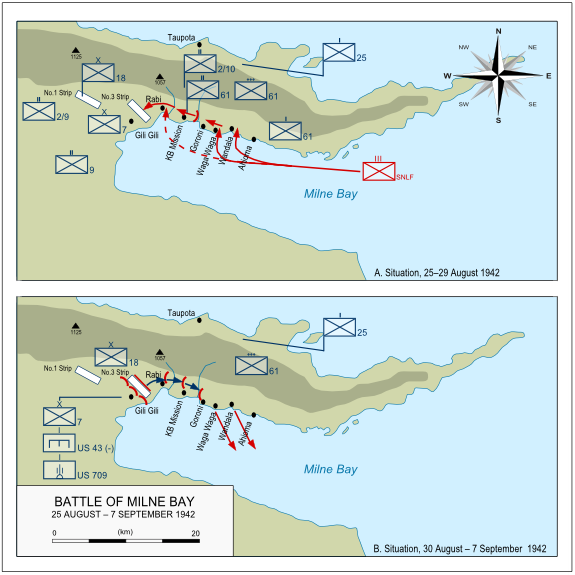
Maop Battle of Milne Bay 25 August - 7 September 1942

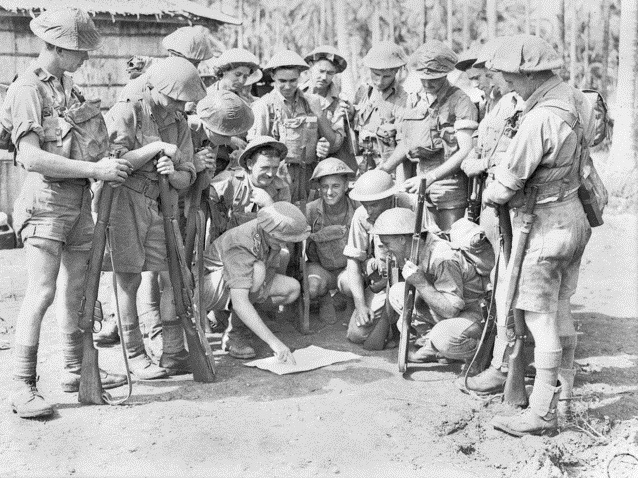
Australian 2-10th Inf Bn Milne Bay Sep 1942

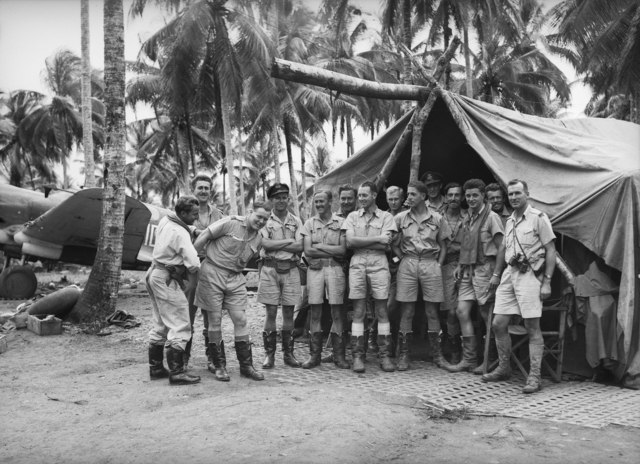
RAAF fighter pilots Milne Bay Sept 1942

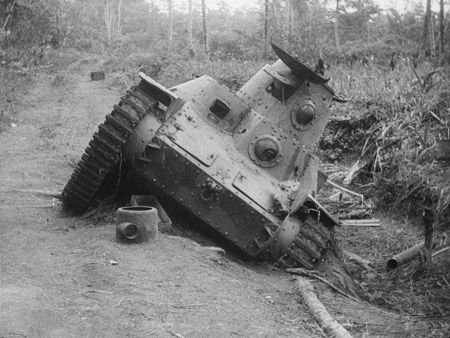
Japanese type 95 tank at Milne Bay after battle

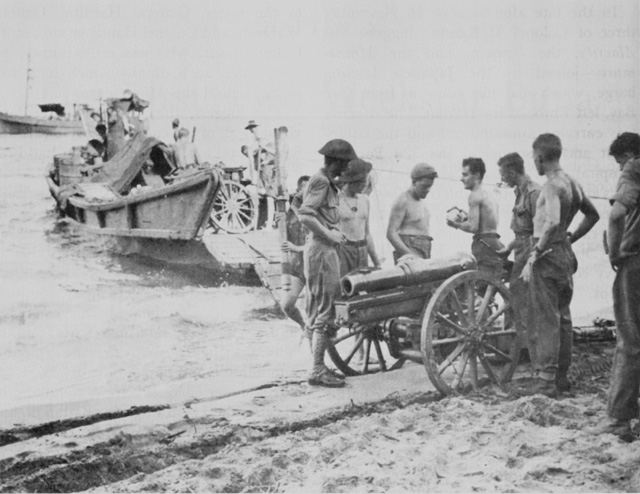
Australians with 3.7 inch howitzer dismantled before being loaded on a Japanese motor-driven barge which was captured at Milne Bay

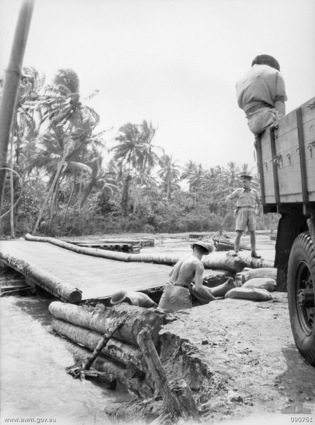
Cyril Clowes with new bridge at Milne Bay

== See also ==
- Gama River
- List of former Royal Australian Navy bases
