= US Naval Base New Guinea =

Major World War 2 bases in Papua New Guinea

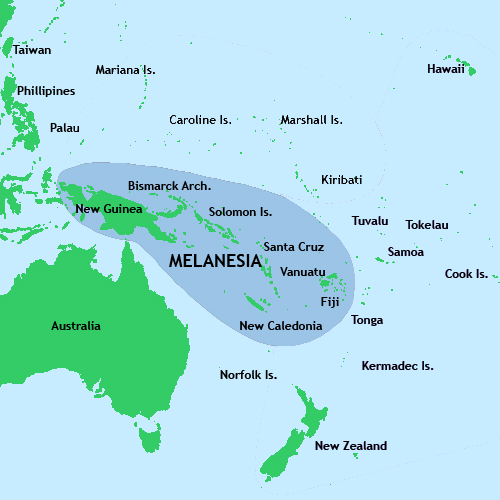
- New Guinea located in relation to Melanesia and the South Pacific

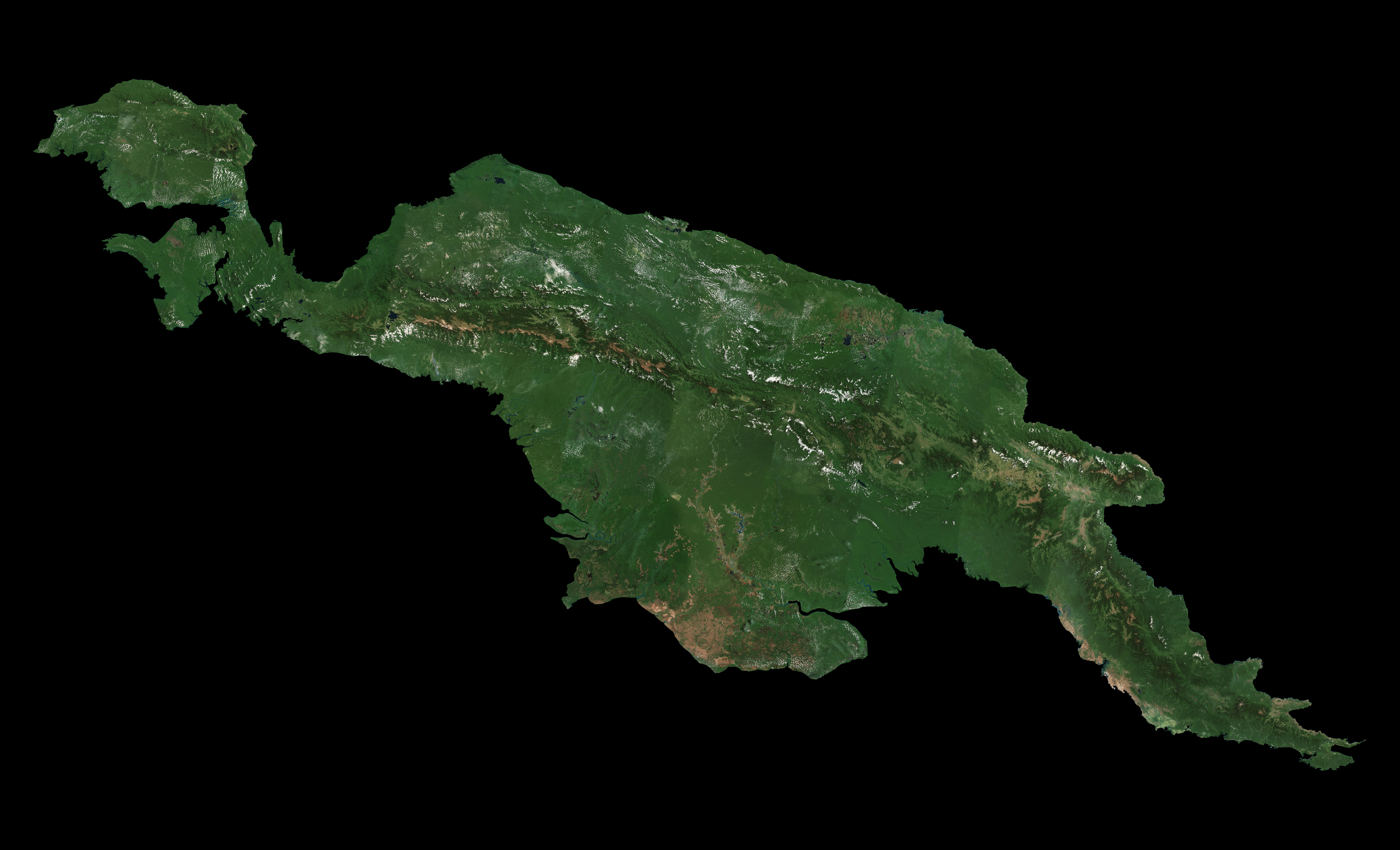
- New Guinea Island

Geography
- Location: Oceania (Melanesia)
- Coordinates: 5°30′S 141°00′E

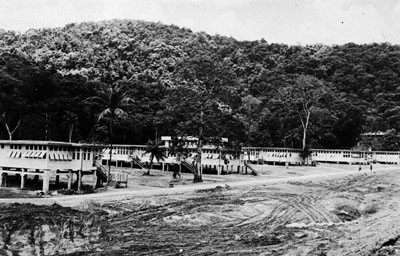
Naval Base Milne Bay, Seabees Advance Base Construction camp on 10 October 1944

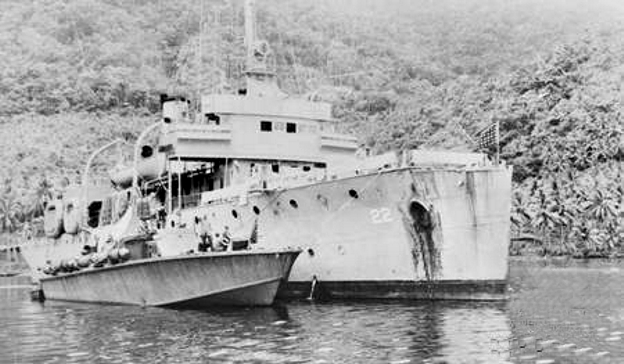
PT boat at Milne Bay, Kana Kopa Base with the USS Tulsa in 1943

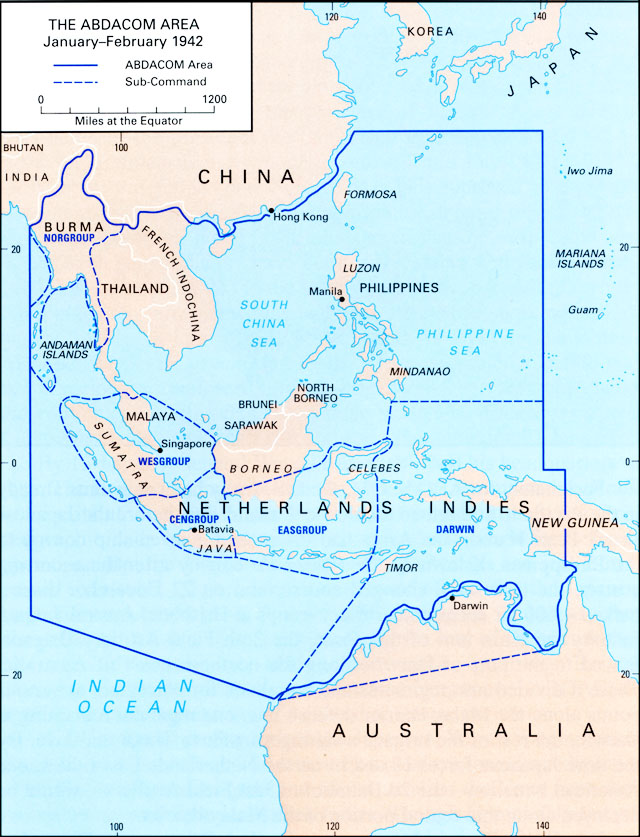
Map of the 1942 American-British-Dutch-Australian Command

US Naval Base New Guinea was number of United States Navy bases on the island of New Guinea (then divided into Dutch New Guinea, the Territory of New Guinea and the Territory of Papua) during World War II. Australia entered World War II on 3 September 1939, being a self-governing nation within the British Empire. The United States formally entered the war on 7 December 1941, following the attack on Pearl Harbor by the Empire of Japan. Following the attack on Pearl Harbor, Japan quickly took over much of the South Pacific Ocean. The United States lost key naval bases in the South Pacific, including Naval Base Manila and Naval Base Subic Bay, both lost in the 1941–42 invasion of the Philippines. Also lost were Naval Base Guam and Wake Atoll. As such, the United States Armed Forces needed new bases in the South West Pacific for staging attacks on Japan's southern empire. The United States built bases first in Australia, then in New Guinea.

== History ==
With the American-British-Dutch-Australian Command (ABDACOM) the Allies tried to limit the advance of Japan. ABDACOM did not have enough troops or supplies to carry out the mission. The northern parts of New Guinea was captured by Japan. The US Naval built bases for troops, ships, submarines, PT boats, seaplanes, supply depots, training camps, fleet recreation facilities, and ship repair depots. To keep supplies following the bases were supplied by the vast II United States Merchant Navy. Some of the bases were shared with the Royal Australian Navy and Royal Australian Air Force. By spring 1943, the build up of the US Navy to support the Pacific War had caused overcrowding at the ports on the east coast of Australia. To help the US Navy Seabees departed Naval Base Brisbane on 19 June 1943 to set up a new base in Milne Bay. The Naval Base Milne Bay was a new major United States Navy sea and airbase base built on Milne Bay in Milne Bay Province in south-eastern Papua New Guinea. New Guinea is a tropical rainforest island near the equator. Troops had to battle heavy rains and tropical diseases. After the war in 1945, the New Guinea bases closed.

Japan built a large base at Rabaul on the island of New Britain with 110,000 Japanese troops. Rabaul was invasion bypassed in the island hoping Pacific war efforts. Rabaul was attacked by air and had its supply lines cut off by sea, called Operation Cartwheel, making the neutralisation of Rabaul.

== Major bases in New Guinea ==
- Naval Base Milne Bay Fleet Pos Office # 167 codename Edur
  - Kana Kopa PT Boat Base FPO# 714
  - Milne Bay Submarine Base
  - Gilli Gilli Base FPO# 717
  - Swinger Bay Alotau Base FPO# 818
  - Hilimoi Bay hospital FPO# 817
- Naval Base Port Moresby FPO# 162
- Naval Base Finschhafen FPO# 722 code codename Urom at Dreger Harbour
- Naval Base Hollandia FPO# 3115
- Naval Base Madang FPO# 928
- Naval Base Woodlark Island FPO# 528
- Naval Base Merauke
- Naval Base Biak Island to support Mokmer Airfield. FPO# 3505
- Naval Base Manus, in the Admiralty Islands, just north of New Guinea, including Seeadler Harbor

== Minor bases in New Guinea ==
Map of New Guinea just south of Micronesia (shown in dark magenta)

- Naval Base Lae
- Naval Base Mios Woendi
- Naval Base Fegrusson on Fegrusson Island FPO # 523
- Naval Base Samarai Island on Samarai Islands FPO # 421
- Naval Base Goodenough Island on Goodenough Island FPO # 724
- Naval Base Aitape at Aitape FPO# 927
- Naval Base Wewak at Wewak FPO# 3074
- Naval Base Saidor at Saidor FPO# 3086
- Naval Base Sungum FPO# 3088
- Naval Base Japen Island on Japen Island
- Naval Base Vogelkop on Vogelkop Island
  - Naval Base Cape Sansapor FPO# 3151
- Naval Base Kornasoren FPO# 3155 and Naval Base Kamirion FPO#3265 on Noemfoor Island in support of Kornasoren Airfields
- Naval Base in Tufi, PT boat base
- Naval Base at Gasmata Fleet Post Office #723
- Naval Base Wakde Island on Wakde Island in support of Wakde Airfield FPO# 3415
- Naval Base Noemfoor
- Buna, Papua New Guinea – Advanced Base, airfield, PT boat base (Battle of Buna–Gona)
- Base on Sasavele Island FPO# 529, part of the Landings on Rendova
- Base at Mohile, FPO# 806
- Naval Base Ondonga, FPO# 626, at Ondonga Airfield
- Naval Base Cape Gloucester, New Britain FPO# 721
- Naval Base Talasea at Talasea, New Britain FPO# 941
- Naval Base Hoskins at Hoskins Airport, New Britain FPO# 942
- Naval Base Rabaul at Rabaul, New Britain FPO# 3068
- Naval Base Nantambu at Nantambu, New Britain FPO# 3422
- Naval Base Green Islands at Green Islands after battle PT boat base
- Naval Base Emirau in Homestead Lagoon on Emirau Island, New Britain, PT Boat base
- Naval Base Kiriwina, at Kiriwina Island, PT boat base and support of Kiriwina Airfield
- Naval Base Rein Bay, PT boat base at 5.566°S 149.196°E
- Naval Base Amsterdam Island at Amsterdam Island also called Mios Su
- Fergusson Island PT Boat Base

== POWs ==
As in other theaters of war Japan's treatment of POWs and civilians was very poor. Many were exhausted from hunger and disease. Many deaths were caused by the diversion of food, such as rice, to Japanese troops from the New Guinea population. Some were turned into Japan's forced labourers, called romusha. International Red Cross packages were not distributed to POWs. In the New Guinea there were both massacres and executions of POWs:

- At the Tol Plantation massacre 160 Australian were executed and at nearby Waitavalo Plantation, another group of eleven Australian prisoners were shot.
- On the Japanese destroyer Akikaze on 18 March 1943 German residents from Wewak, New Guinea were executed. About thirty German residents, including German clergymen, nuns with two children were taken after Japan suspected a radio transmitter at Wewak was reporting ship movements to the Americans.
- Australian POW, Sgt. Leonard Siffleet, captured in New Guinea, was beheaded in 1943.
- Spencer Walklate an Australian Army POW and Eagleton POW were tortured and murdered on Muschu Island a Schouten Islands
- The Japanese Lieutenant Hisata Tomiyasu found guilty of killing 14 Indian soldiers and of cannibalism at Wewak in 1944. A common activity in New Guinea.

== Gallery ==
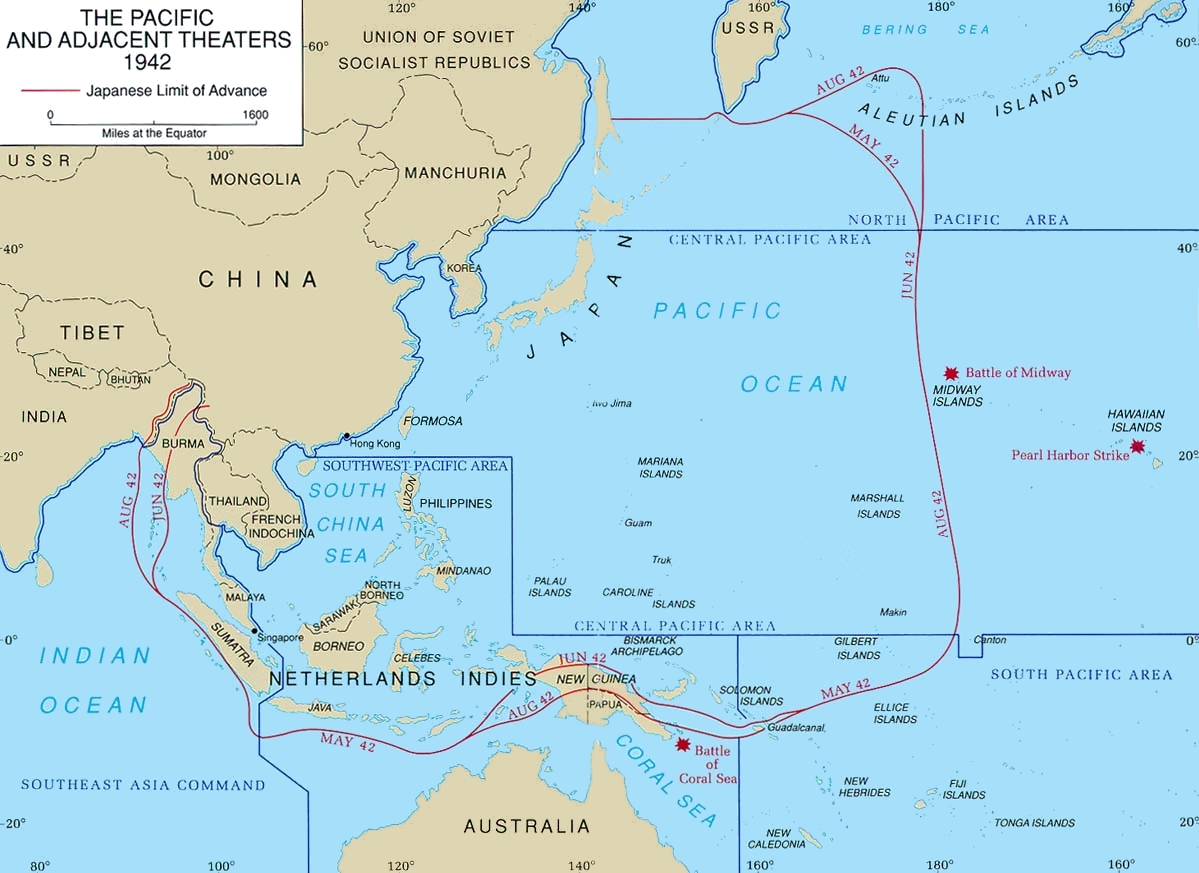
Pacific War Theater Areas map 1942

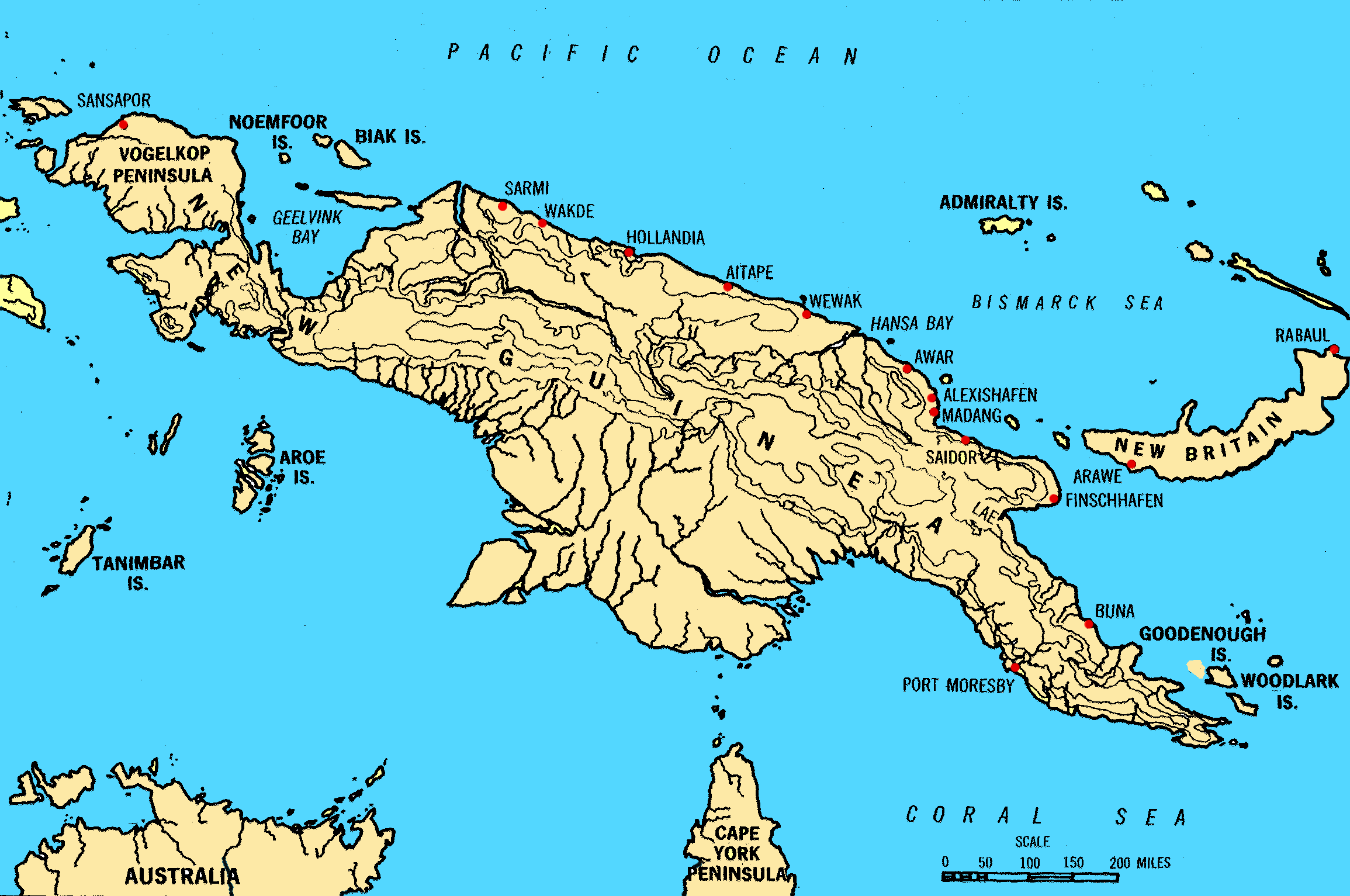
Map of New Guinea, with place names as used in English in the 1940s

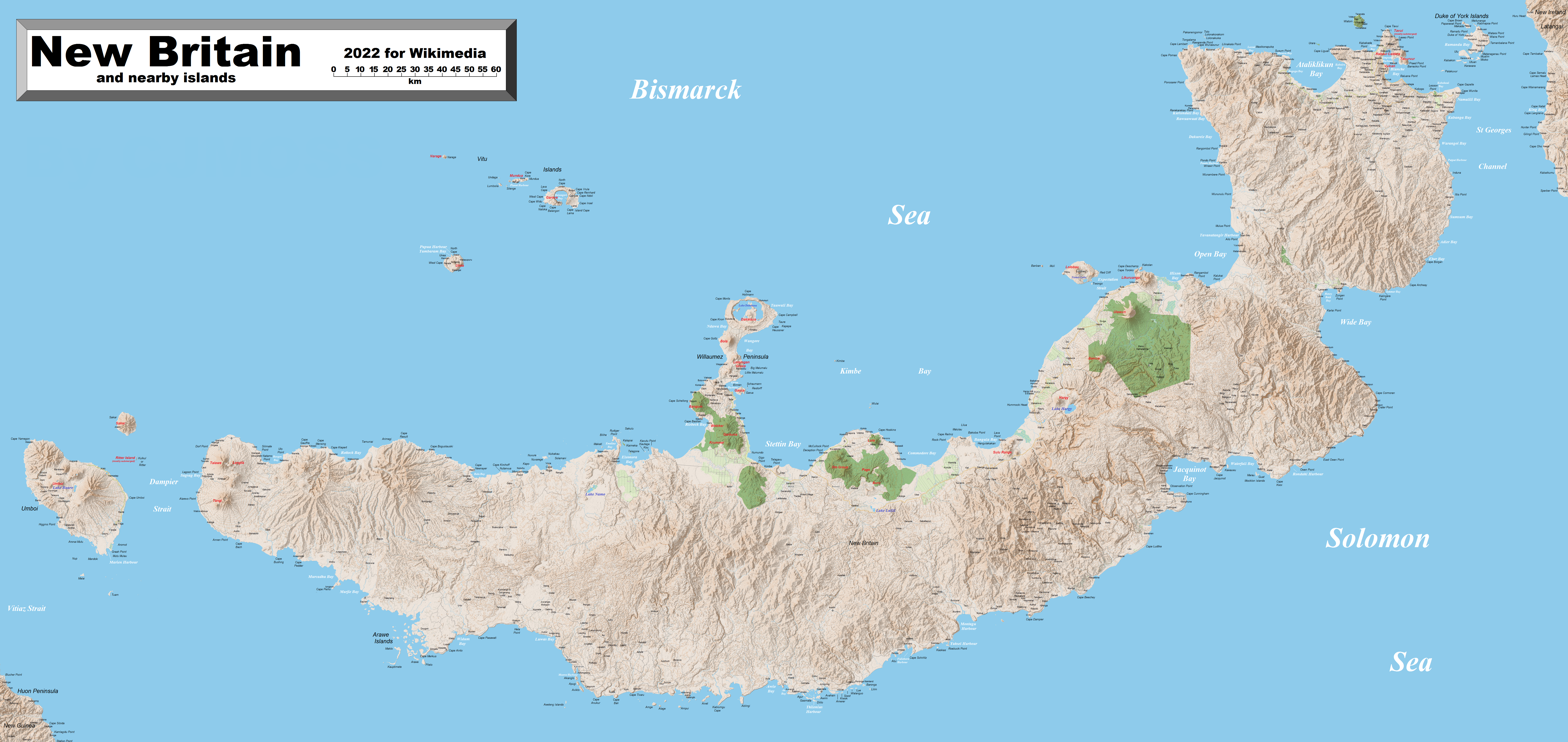
Map New Britain Island, to the northeast of New Guinea Island

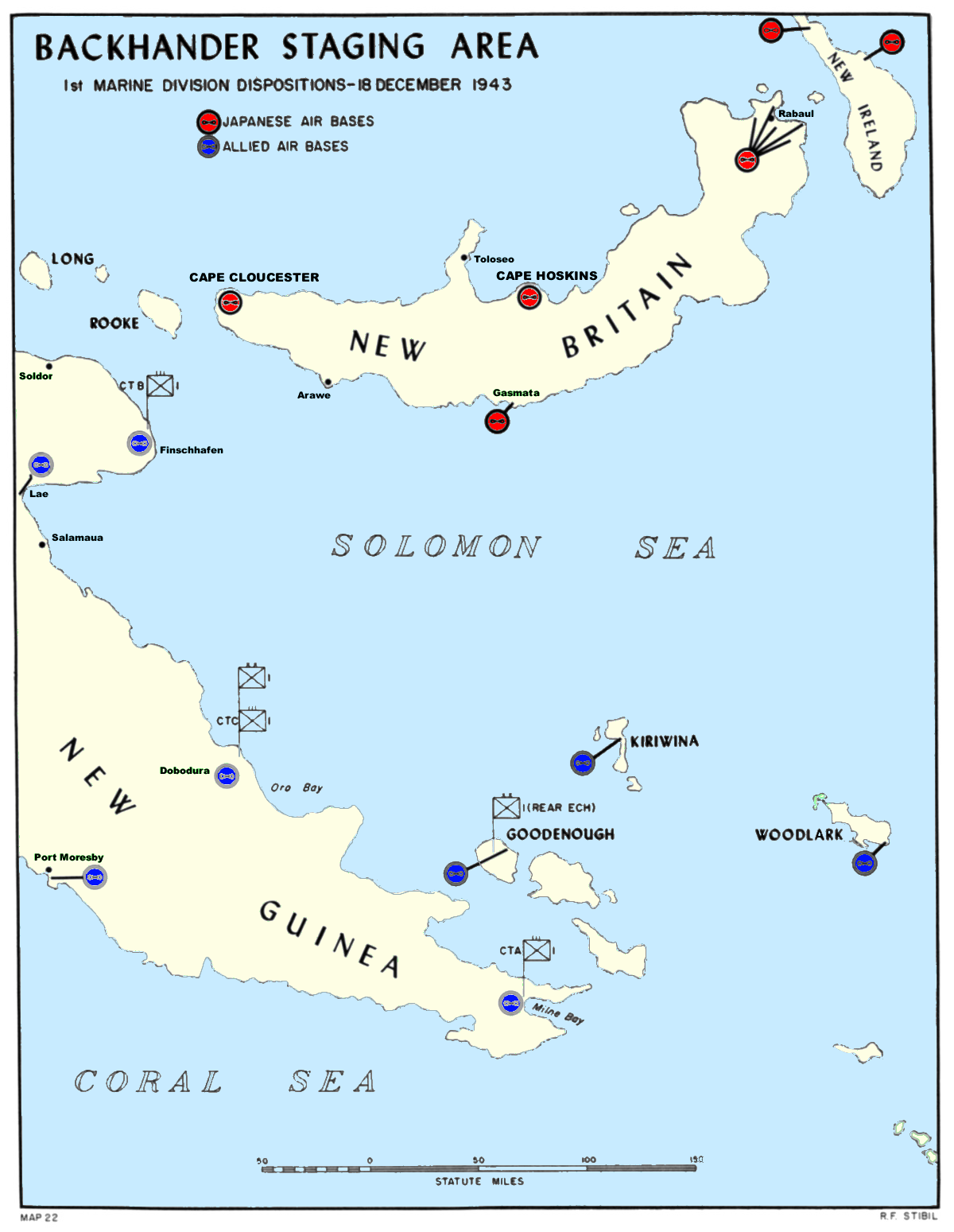
1943 Backhander Staging Area in New Britain and New Guinea

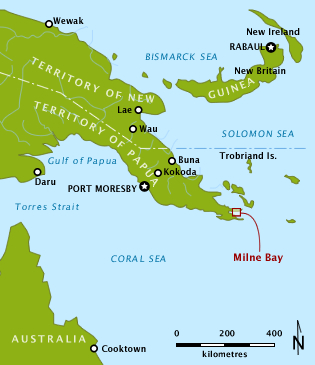
Location of Naval Base Milne Bay

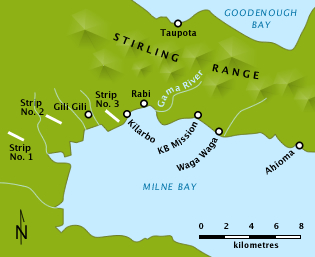
Milne Bay with key locations

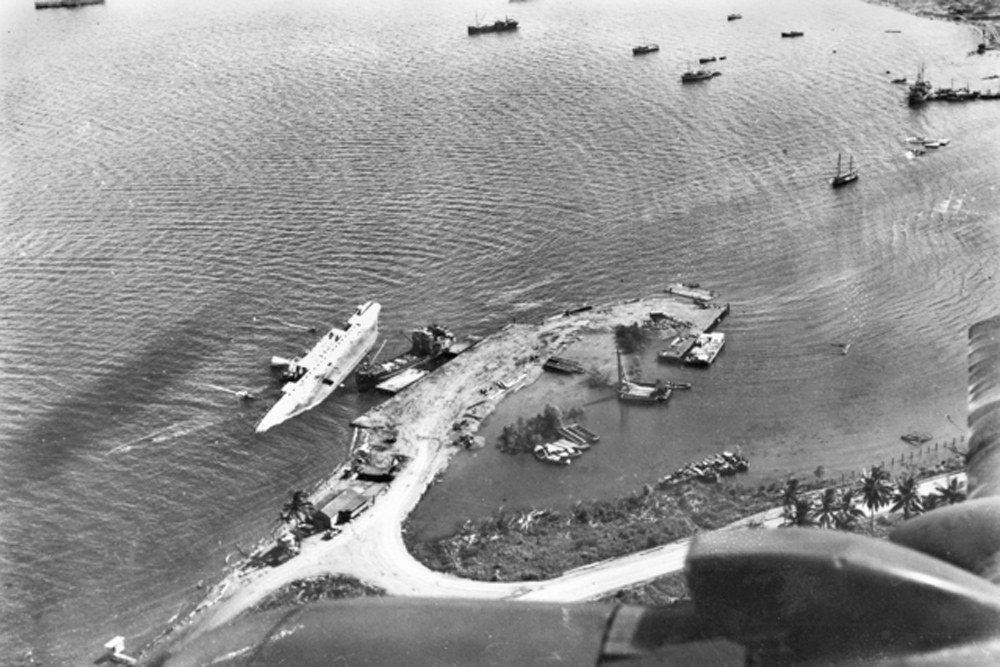
MV Anshun lying on her side at Gili Gili Dock, in Milne Bay, New Guinea, 1942

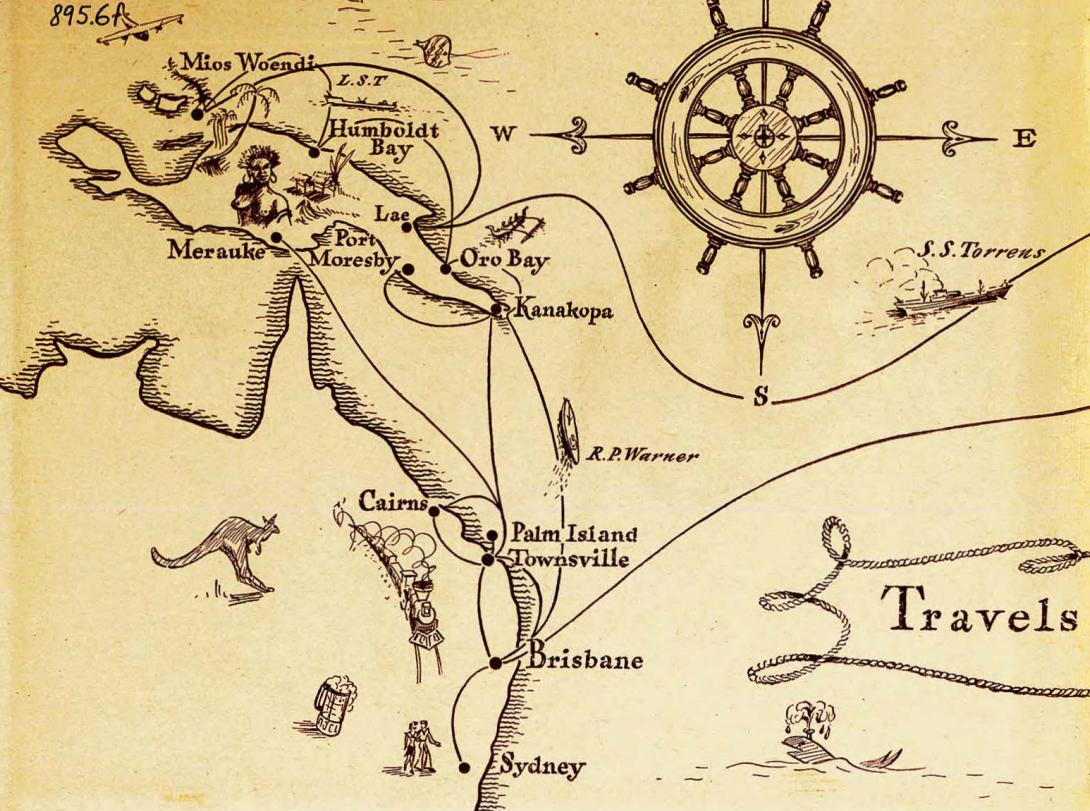
Camp Seabee Naval Base Brisbane, base building trips

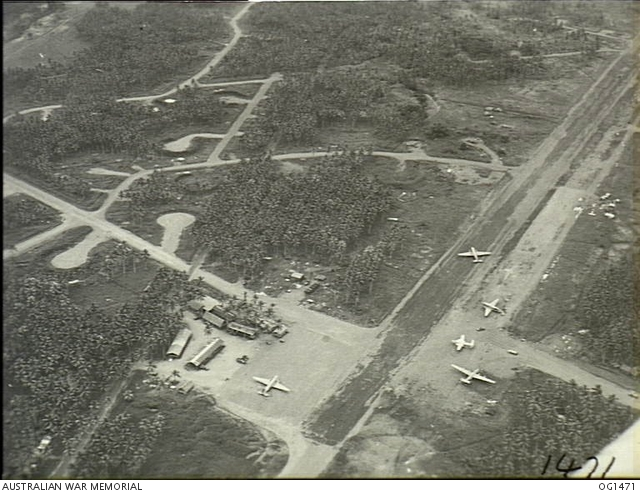
Gurney Airfield in 1944

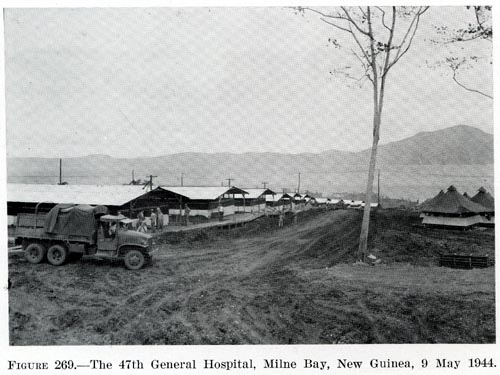
US Army, LLU's 47 General Hospital, Milne Bay

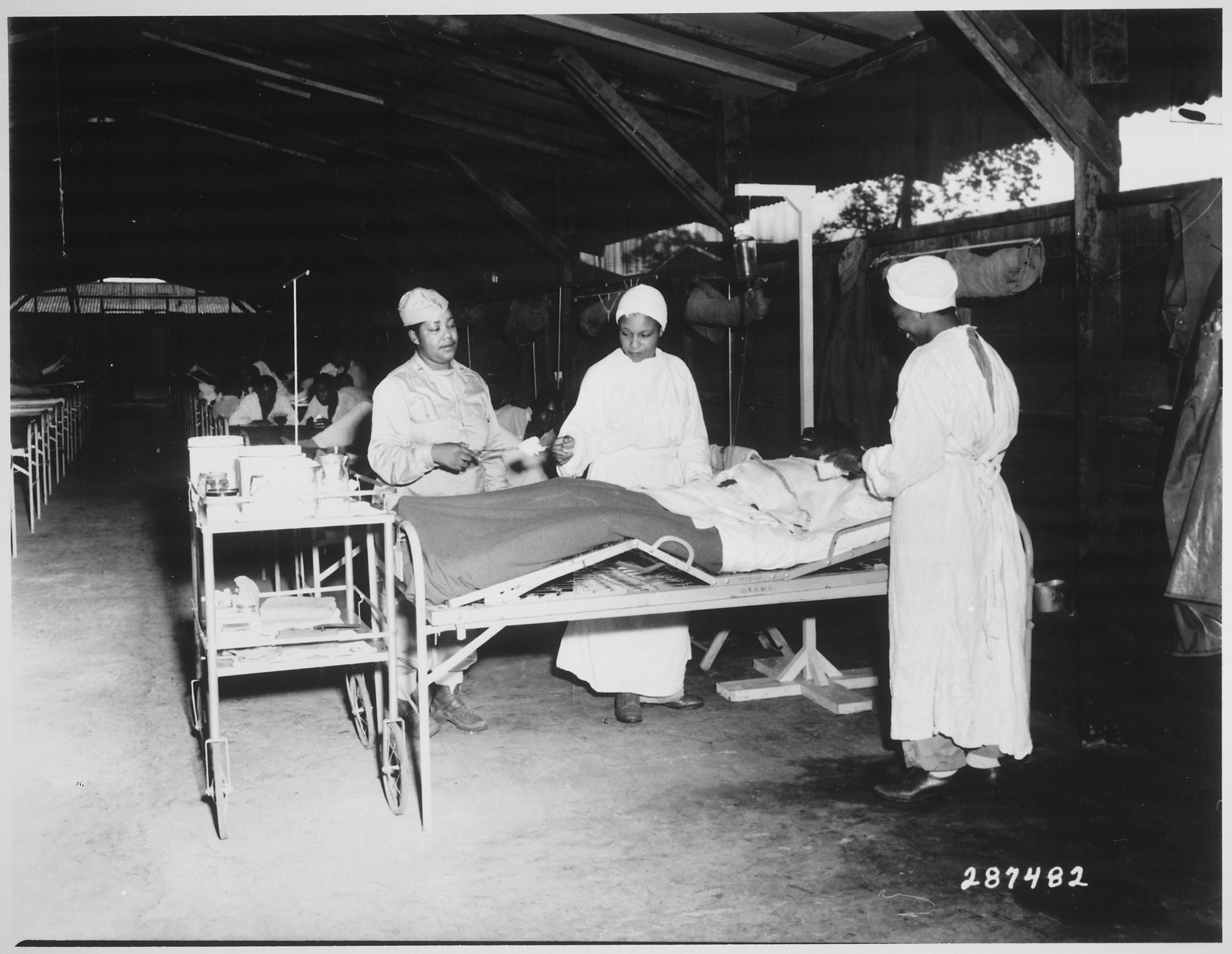
Surgical ward treatment at the 268th Station Hospital, Base A, Milne Bay, Left to right, Sgt. Lawrence McKr

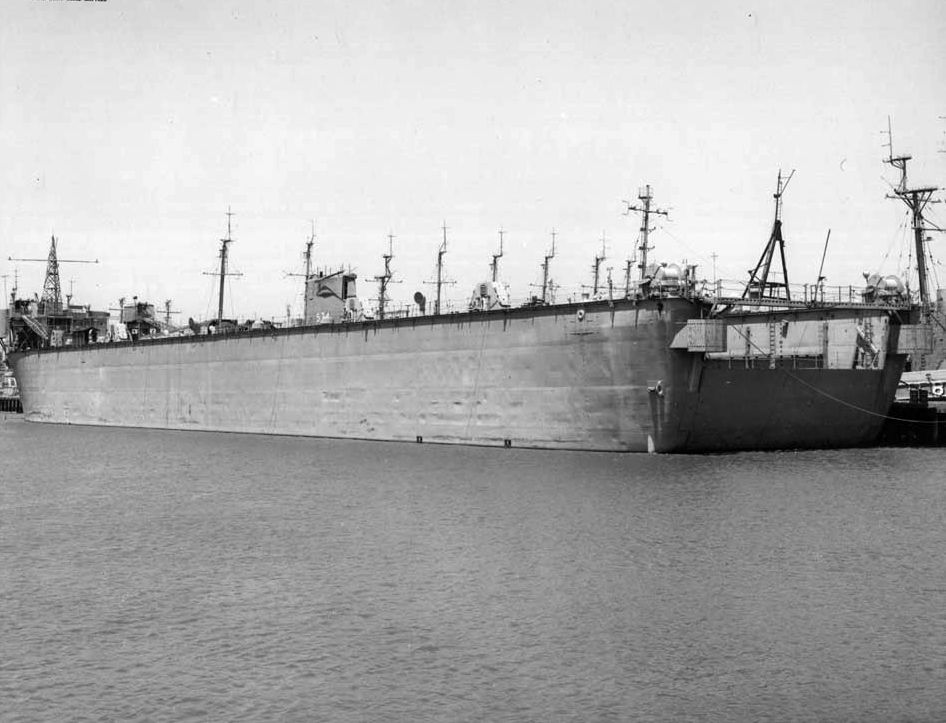
Auxiliary floating drydock, ARD, built by the Pacific Bridge Company

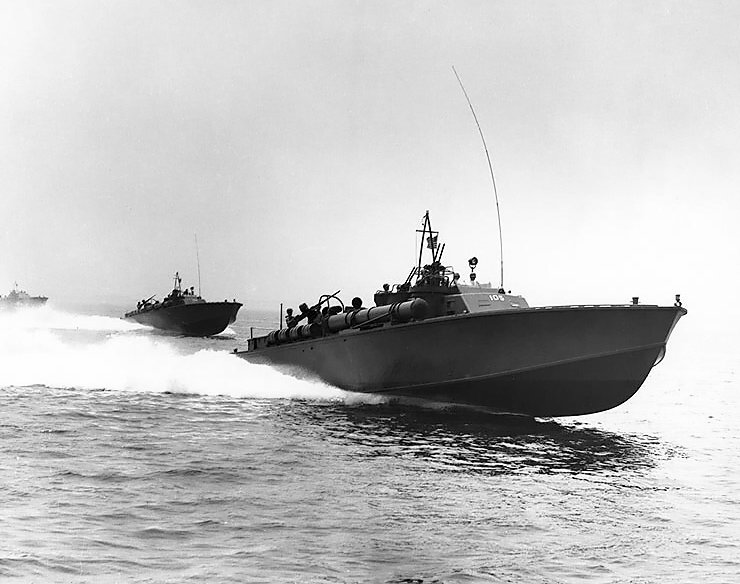
USS PT-105

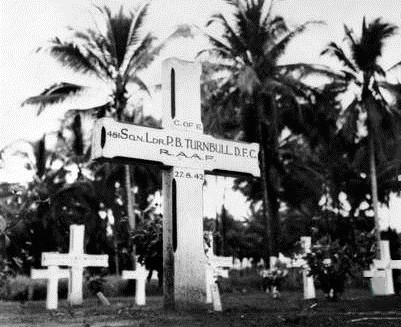
Milne Bay's Turnbull grave in 1943

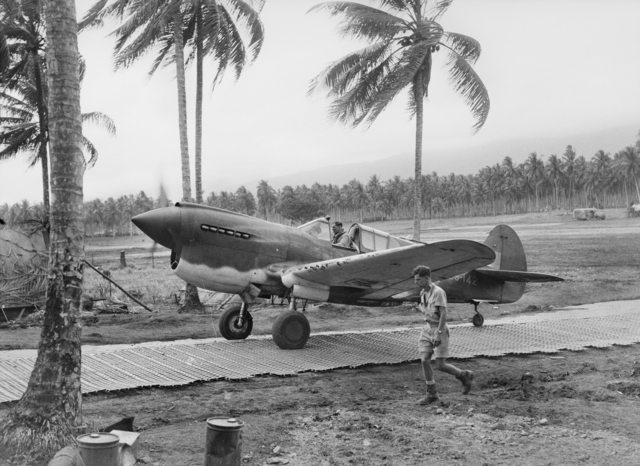
An Australian P-40 at Milne Bay

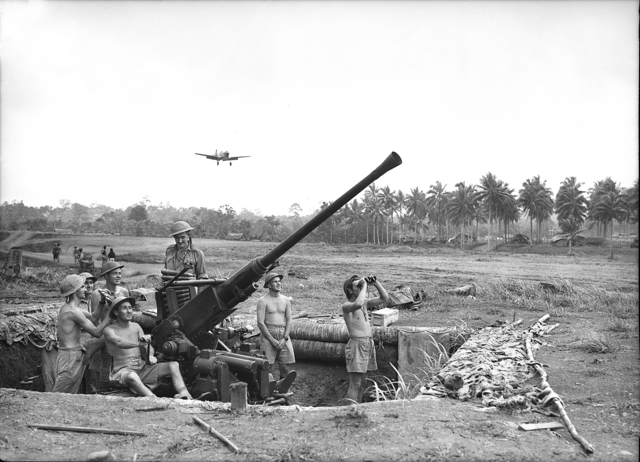
An Australian Bofors 40 mm anti-aircraft gun of the 2/9th Light Anti-Aircraft Battery at Milne Bay No. 1 Airstrip

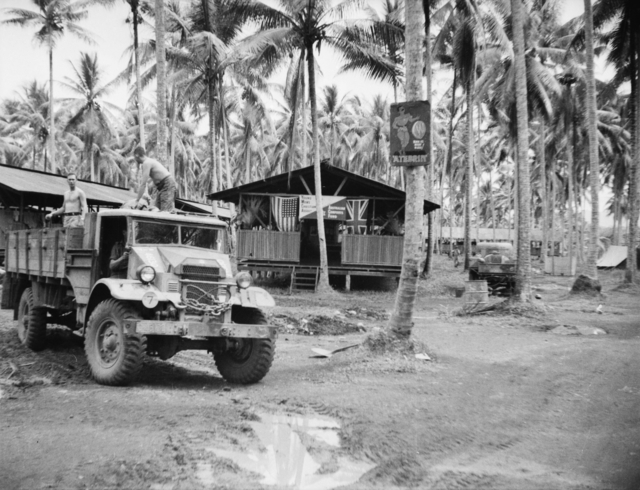
Australian - USA camp at Milne Bay

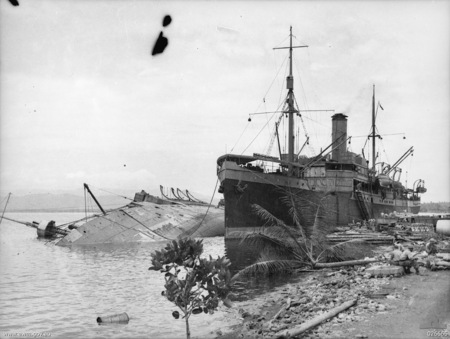
MV Anshun lying on her side at Gili Gili Dock, in Milne Bay, New Guinea, 1942

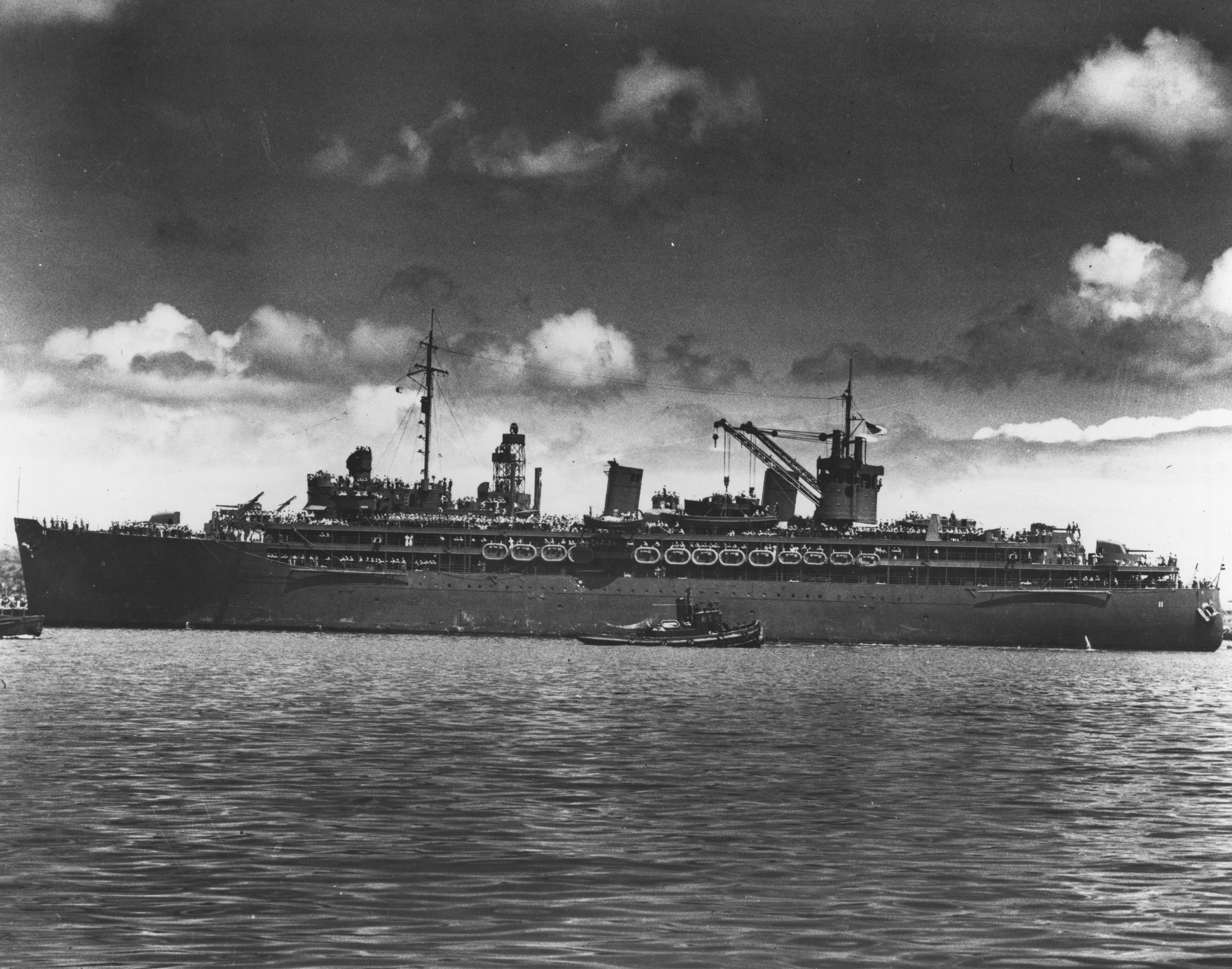
USS Fulton was stationed at the Milne Bay to service submarines

South Pacific islands in 1945

== See also ==
- Naval Base Borneo
- Axis naval activity in Australian waters
- US Naval Advance Bases
- List of Royal Australian Navy bases

== Sources ==
- Mizuma, Masanori (2013). ひと目でわかる「アジア解放」時代の日本精神 [Japanese spirit in the "Liberation of Asia" era that can be seen at a glance] (in Japanese). PHP Institute. ISBN 978-4-569-81389-9.
- Pramoedya Ananta Toer (1998). The Mute's Soliloquy. Translated by Willem Samuels. Penguin. ISBN 0-14-028904-6.
- Queensland Ex-POW Reparation Committee (1990). Nippon Very Sorry, Many Men Must Die: Submission to the United Nations Commission of Human Rights (ECOSOC Resolution 1503). Brisbane, Queensland: Boolarong. ISBN 978-0-86439-112-4.
- Vickers, Adrian (2013). A History Modern of Indonesia (2nd ed.). Cambridge University Press. ISBN 978-1-107-62445-0.
- Wigmore, Lionel (1957). The Japanese Thrust. Australia in the War of 1939–1945. Vol. IV (1st ed.). Canberra: Australian War Memorial. OCLC 3134219.
