= No. 4 Forward Air Control Flight RAAF =

No. 4 Forward Air Control Flight
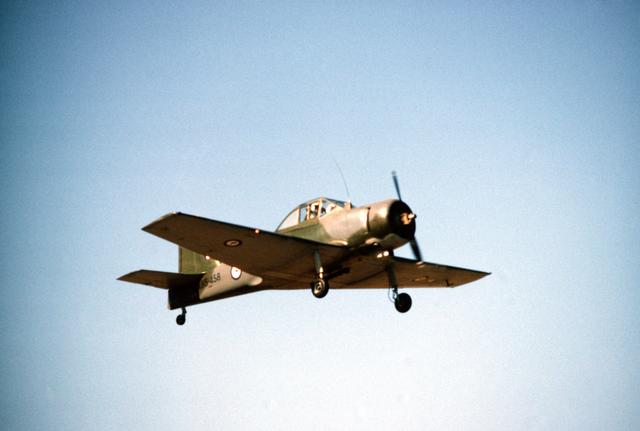
- A No. 4 Forward Air Control Flight Winjeel in 1980
- Active: 1970–1989
- Country: Australia
- Branch: Royal Australian Air Force
- Role: Forward air control training

Aircraft flown
- Reconnaissance: CAC Winjeel (1989–1995)

No. 4 Forward Air Control Flight was a Royal Australian Air Force forward air control training unit. The Flight was formed on 1 April 1970 at RAAF Base Williamtown and was equipped with four CAC Winjeel aircraft. The Flight was responsible for training RAAF, Royal Australian Navy and Australian Army pilots and participated in most Australian military exercises. No. 4 Forward Air Control Flight was disbanded on 1 January 1989 and became 'C' Flight of the newly reformed No. 76 Squadron. No. 4 Squadron is the RAAF's current forward air control unit.
