= No. 76 Squadron RAAF =

Royal Australian Air Force squadron

- No. 76 Squadron's crest
- Active: 1942–1948; 1949–1955; 1960–1973; 1989–current
- Country: Australia
- Branch: Royal Australian Air Force
- Part of: No. 78 Wing, Air Combat Group
- Current base: RAAF Base Williamtown
- Engagements: World War II

Commanders
- Notable commanders: Peter Jeffrey (1942); Peter Turnbull (1942); Keith Truscott (1942–1943)

Aircraft flown
- Fighter: P-40 Kittyhawk (1942–1945); P-51 Mustang (1945–1951) de Havilland Vampire (1951–1955, 1960–1961); CAC Sabre (1961–1968); Dassault Mirage III (1968–1973)
- Reconnaissance: CAC Winjeel (1989–1995); Pilatus PC-9 (1995–2002)
- Trainer: Aermacchi MB-326 (1989–2000); Hawk 127 (2000–current)

No. 76 Squadron is a Royal Australian Air Force (RAAF) flight training squadron. Established in 1942, it operated P-40 Kittyhawk fighter aircraft in the South West Pacific theatre during World War II. Following the end of hostilities it re-equipped with P-51 Mustangs and formed part of Australia's contribution to the occupation of Japan until disbanding in 1948. The squadron was re-formed in 1949 and three years later transferred to Malta, where it operated de Havilland Vampire jet fighters on garrison duty until again disbanding in 1955. It was reactivated in 1960 and operated CAC Sabre and Dassault Mirage III fighters in Australia until 1973. No. 76 Squadron was re-formed in its present incarnation in 1989 and is currently stationed at RAAF Base Williamtown, New South Wales, where it operates Hawk 127 (upgraded to Hawk 128 standard) jet training aircraft.

== History ==
=== Milne Bay and northern Australia ===
No. 76 Squadron was formed at Archerfield Airport, Queensland, on 14 March 1942 as the RAAF's second squadron equipped with P-40E Kittyhawk fighters (the first being No. 75 Squadron). Led by Squadron Leader Peter Jeffrey, it moved to Weir Strip near Townsville in mid-April to continue training. During April seven of No. 76 Squadron's P-40s were ferried to Port Moresby and handed over to No. 75 Squadron, which was suffering heavy losses while defending the town from Japanese air attacks. On 1 and 13 May No. 76 Squadron Kittyhawks were scrambled to intercept Japanese aircraft near Townsville but did not make contact with the intruders. The squadron completed its training in June, by which time it had received its full complement of 24 fighters and 38 pilots.

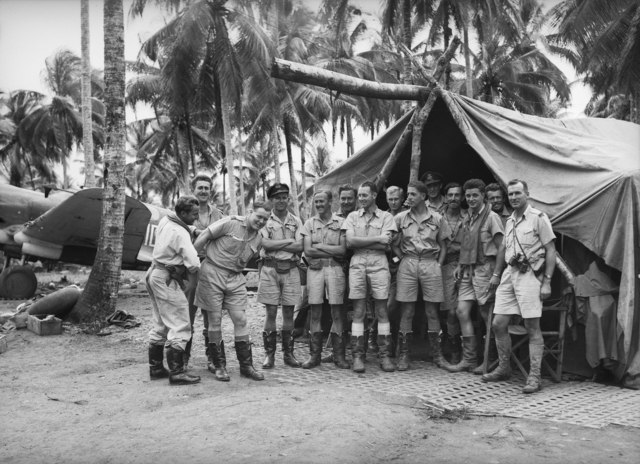
RAAF pilots, mainly from No. 76 Squadron, at Milne Bay in September 1942

The squadron deployed to the front lines of the New Guinea Campaign during July 1942. Its advance party left Townsville for its new base at Milne Bay early in the month, and the fighters departed on 19 July. No. 76 Squadron flew its first combat mission on 22 July when its new commanding officer, Squadron Leader Peter Turnbull, led a force of six Kittyhawks from Port Moresby to attack Japanese positions near Gona. No. 75 Squadron also arrived at Milne Bay on 31 July. Conditions at Milne Bay were extremely difficult as the squadron's airfield was not finished, living and maintenance facilities were almost non-existent and high rainfall meant that any aircraft which ran off the runways and taxiways became bogged in mud. No. 76 Squadron aircraft intercepted Japanese raids on Milne Bay on 4 and 11 August.

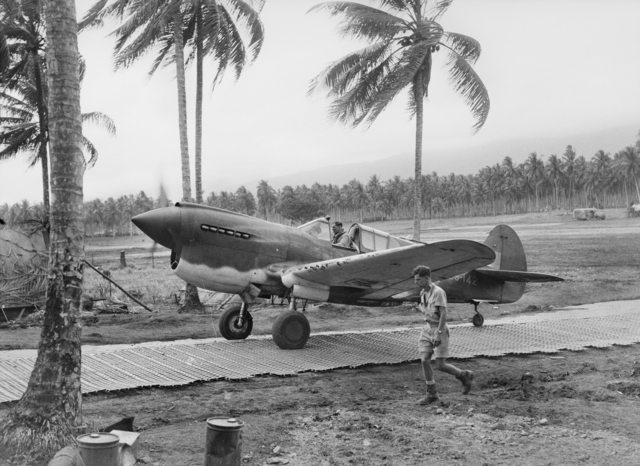
Squadron Leader Keith "Bluey" Truscott, CO of 76 Squadron, taxiing along Marston Matting at Milne Bay in September 1942

During late August and early September No. 75 and No. 76 Squadrons were involved in the Battle of Milne Bay. On 25 August No. 76 Squadron aircraft bombed a Japanese naval convoy which was approaching the area. While this attack damaged several ships, the force continued on and landed troops at Milne Bay on the night of 25/26 August. From dawn the next day the two Kittyhawk squadrons were heavily engaged with attacking Japanese positions and intercepting Japanese air raids on the area. On 28 August the Kittyhawks were withdrawn to Port Moresby when the Japanese troops came close to their airstrips, but they returned to Milne Bay the next day. No. 75 and No. 76 Squadrons supported the Allied counter-offensive at Milne Bay which ended with the remaining Japanese troops being evacuated in early September. The squadron flew 220 sorties between 26 and 5 September but suffered a heavy blow when Squadron Leader Turnbull was shot down and killed on 27 August. Turnbull was replaced by Squadron Leader Keith Truscott that day. Following the battle Lieutenant General Sydney Rowell, the commander of New Guinea Force, stated that the attacks made by the two squadrons on the day of the Japanese landing were "the decisive factor" in the Allied victory. No. 76 Squadron was relieved by two United States Army Air Forces (USAAF) squadrons on 21 September and began moving to the Darwin area of northern Australia the next day.

No. 76 Squadron completed its movement to Strauss Airfield south of Darwin in early October and became part of the force responsible for defending the area against Japanese air raids on military facilities and Allied shipping. It conducted relatively little flying during October due to shortages of equipment and a high sickness rate from malaria, however. The squadron's flying effort increased in November and December and in January 1943 it was scrambled to intercept several Japanese raids. During one of these attacks Squadron Leader Truscott shot down a Japanese Mitsubishi G4M "Betty" bomber on 21 January. The Supermarine Spitfire-equipped No. 1 Wing RAAF began to arrive in the Darwin area in January and at the end of the month No. 76 Squadron was transferred to Onslow, Western Australia. The ship carrying the squadron's personnel and equipment arrived at Onslow on 5 February and were unloaded the next day, but on the 12th of the month the squadron moved the nearby "Potshot" airfield as there was insufficient water at Onslow to supply the unit. No. 76 Squadron conducted patrols from Potshot and Onslow during March and April to protect the United States Navy facility in the area, though these were marred by Squadron Leader Truscott's death in a flying accident on 28 March. On 27 April the squadron received orders to move to Bankstown Airport in Sydney to be reequipped with more advanced P-40M Kittyhawks. It was relieved at Potshot by a flight of CAC Boomerang fighters from No. 85 Squadron.

=== Offensive operations ===
The squadron took delivery of 24 P-40Ms on 8 May and after a period of training was deployed to Goodenough Island in late June 1943, where it became part of No. 73 Wing. This wing formed part of No. 9 Operational Group, which was a mobile formation tasked with supporting Allied offensives in New Guinea and nearby islands. As a result, No. 76 Squadron was continuously in action until the end of the war and was mainly employed in fighter sweeps and ground attack missions as few Japanese aircraft were encountered. No. 73 Wing moved to Kiriwina between August and early September, and the squadron became operational there on 10 September. No. 76 Squadron took part in attacks on the airfield at Gasmata between September and December and on 15 December was part of the force which provided air cover for the United States Army landing at Arawe on the south coast of New Britain. The squadron's activities during December were so intensive that it had to reduce its training program.

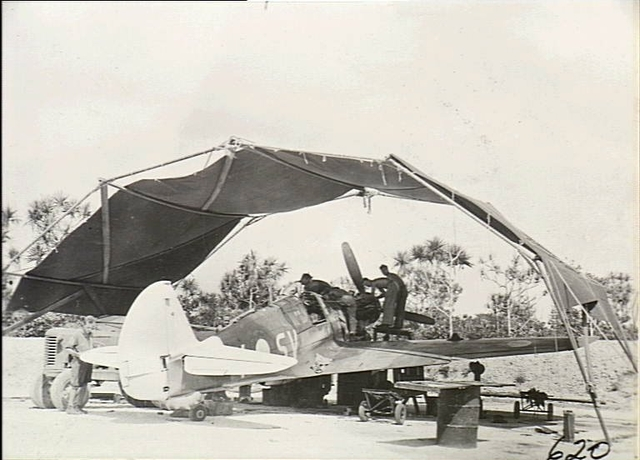
A No. 76 Squadron P-40 Kittyhawk undergoing maintenance at Kiriwina in January 1944

No. 76 Squadron continued to support Allied operations around New Guinea during 1944. On 17 January it took part in an attack on a Japanese camp near Lindenhafen, New Britain which involved 73 aircraft and was the largest RAAF operation to that point in the war. Several weeks later, No. 73 Wing, which at the time comprised the Kittyhawk-equipped No. 76 and No. 77 Squadrons as well as the Spitfire-equipped No. 79 Squadron, was selected to garrison the Admiralty Islands for 90 days after they were captured in the Admiralty Islands campaign. US Army troops from the 1st Cavalry Division began landing on these islands on 29 February and No. 76 Squadron arrived there on 9 March. The squadron subsequently provided fighter cover and close air support for the Allied forces in the area alongside the rest of No. 73 Wing. There was no need for fighter protection of this area by August and No. 76 Squadron was transferred to No. 81 Wing, which also comprised No. 77 and No. 82 Squadrons and was part of No. 10 Group. No. 76 and No. 77 Squadrons completed their movement to Noemfoor on 13 September where they were concentrated with the rest of the wing. From mid October No. 10 Group attacked Japanese positions in western New Guinea and the eastern islands of the Netherlands East Indies (NEI) to support the United States landing at Leyte in the Philippines. No. 81 Wing concentrated on New Guinea while No. 78 Wing's three Kittyhawk-equipped squadrons struck targets in the other islands. On 25 November, No. 10 Group was renamed the First Tactical Air Force (1TAF).

The squadron remained at Noemfoor until April 1945 when it moved forward to Morotai in the NEI ahead of participating in the Australian-led Borneo Campaign. In mid-May it moved again to Sanga Sanga airfield in the Sulu Archipelago to provide fighter cover over the island of Tarakan, where Australian troops had landed on 1 May. The squadron flew patrols over Tarakan every day, weather permitting, until the end of the month. No. 76 Squadron also struck Sandakan and Kudat on the north coast of Borneo on several occasions, including a particularly successful attack against Sandakan on 27 May which was made in cooperation with United States Navy PT boats. The squadron's aircraft returned to Morotai on 13 June to free up space at Sanga Sanga for USAAF P-38 Lightnings, but on 17 June they began to move to the island of Labuan to support Australian forces engaged in the Battle of North Borneo. The rest of No. 81 Wing, which had been reinforced with the Spitfire-equipped No. 457 Squadron, was subsequently concentrated at Labuan and operated over Borneo until the end of the war in August. No. 76 Squadron's last mission of the war was flown on 14 August, one day before the Japanese surrender. The squadron suffered 22 fatalities during the war.

=== Cold War ===
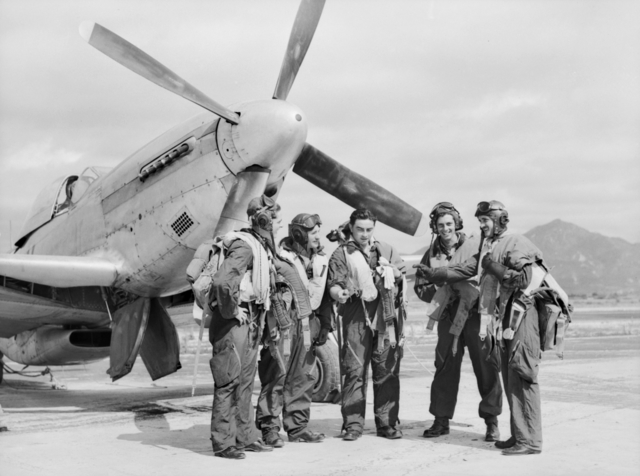
A group of pilots from No. 76 Squadron with a Mustang fighter in Japan, July 1947

Following the end of the war No. 81 Wing was selected to form the main body of the RAAF's contribution to the British Commonwealth Occupation Force (BCOF) in Japan. During August and September 1945 personnel who had not volunteered for this duty left No. 76 Squadron and it was re-equipped with P-51 Mustang fighters. The wing's ground party left Labuan by sea on 11 February 1946 and No. 76 Squadron became the first BCOF squadron to arrive in Japan on 9 March when it landed at Iwakuni. The squadron moved to No. 81 Wing's permanent base at Bofu two days later. During the occupation of Japan No. 81 Wing flew uneventful surveillance patrols over BCOF's sector of the country. In February 1948 No. 76 Squadron moved to Iwakuni where it was disbanded on 29 October 1948 as part of a reduction in the RAAF strength in Japan.

No. 76 Squadron was re-formed at RAAF Base Williamtown on 24 January 1949. The squadron was again equipped with Mustangs, but a shortage of personnel and aircraft meant that it was unable to operate effectively until mid-1950. The Mustangs were replaced with de Havilland Vampire jet fighters in either late 1951 or early 1952. In March 1952 the Australian Government decided to re-form No. 78 Wing and deploy it to Malta where it would form part of a British force which sought to counter Soviet-influence in the Middle East. No. 75 and No. 76 Squadrons were selected to form the wing's flying units, and they arrived at RAF Hal Far in Malta during July 1952 and were equipped with Vampires leased from the Royal Air Force (RAF). While based at Malta the wing took part in numerous training exercises in the Mediterranean region as well as Europe, including a large-scale NATO exercise in 1953 which involved 2,000 aircraft and 40,000 personnel. In addition, the wing participated in a royal review to commemorate the coronation of Queen Elizabeth II. No. 78 Wing moved to the RAF station at Ta' Qali in June 1953 where it remained until it returned to Australia in late December 1954. No. 76 Squadron arrived back at Williamtown in February 1955 and was disbanded on 16 March that year.

The squadron was re-established at Williamtown on 11 January 1960. It was initially equipped with Vampires, but received more modern CAC Sabres in May 1961. The squadron later formed two aerobatic teams called the Red Diamonds and Black Panthers which took part in air shows and other public events. No. 76 Squadron was re-equipped again with Mirage III fighters in either 1966 or 1968. In 1968 the squadron made a deployment to Darwin to bolster the town's air defences. It continued to use its Mirage IIIs for air defence and ground attack roles until the squadron was disbanded on 24 August 1973 as part of a reduction in the size of the RAAF following Australia's withdrawal from the Vietnam War.

=== Current role ===
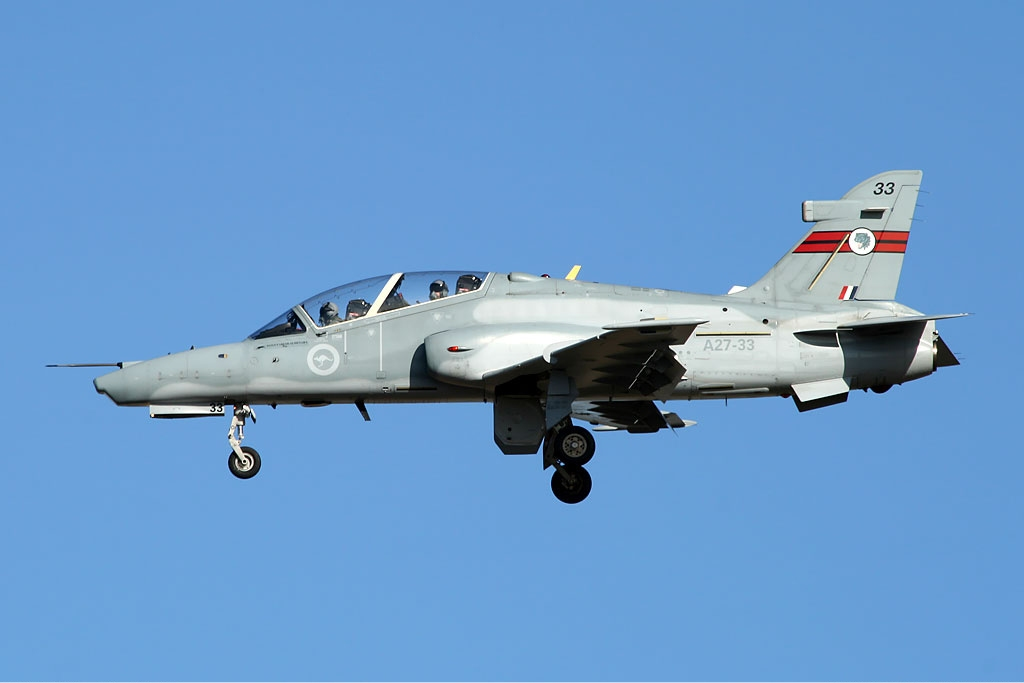
A No. 76 Squadron Hawk 127 in 2007

On 1 January 1989, No. 76 Squadron was formed again at Williamtown as a training unit equipped with Aermacchi MB-326 jets and CAC Winjeel forward air control aircraft. The Aermacchi MB-326s were used to provide jet aircraft training for pilots who had been selected to fly F/A-18 Hornet or F-111 aircraft as well as to support Army and Royal Australian Navy exercises. The Winjeels were used for forward air control tasks and had previously been operated by No. 4 Forward Air Control Flight before becoming 'C' Flight of No. 76 Squadron upon its formation. In 1995, the Winjeels were replaced with modified Pilatus PC-9 trainers. The squadron's forward air control function and aircraft were transferred to the Forward Air Control Development Unit in 2002.

No. 76 Squadron currently forms part of No. 78 Wing and remains at Williamtown. It began to be re-equipped with Hawk 127 jets in October 2000 and had 18 of these aircraft in 2010. The squadron is organised into two flights. Training Flight provides introductory fighter training to pilots who have been trained to operate jet aircraft by No. 79 Squadron. After completing this course the pilots are posted to either No. 2 Operational Conversion Unit to be converted to F-35 Lightning II aircraft or to No. 6 Squadron to learn to fly F/A-18F Super Hornets. Operations Flight provides close air support training for Army and fleet support training for Navy.

A program to modernise all of the RAAF's Hawks to a similar standard to the Royal Air Force's Hawk T.2 aircraft began in 2014, and No. 76 Squadron is scheduled to receive the first upgraded aircraft. It is planned that the squadron will begin delivering training courses using these modernised aircraft by early 2017. The RAAF's Hawk fleet has been upgraded to Hawk 128 standard under the Lead-In Fighter Capability Assurance Program (LIFCAP).
