= Peter Turnbull (RAAF officer) =

Australian World War II flying ace

Peter St George Bruce Turnbull
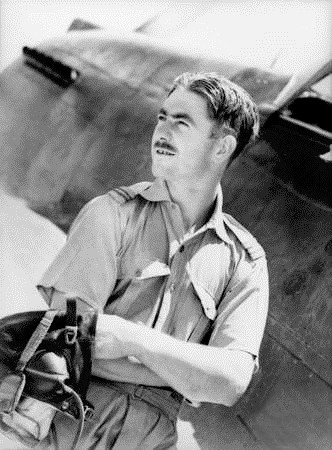
- Flying Officer Peter Turnbull in Palestine, June 1941
- Born: 9 February 1917; Armidale, New South Wales
- Died: 27 August 1942 (aged 25); Milne Bay, New Guinea
- Military career
- Allegiance: Australia
- Branch: Citizens Military Force; Royal Australian Air Force
- Service years: 1938–1942
- Rank: Squadron Leader
- Units: 12/24th Light Horse (1938); No. 3 Squadron (1939–1941); No. 75 Squadron (1942)
- Commands: No. 76 Squadron (1942)
- Conflicts: World War II; Mediterranean and Middle East Theatre; North African campaign; Battle of Bardia; Syria-Lebanon campaign; South West Pacific theatre; New Guinea campaign; Battle of Port Moresby; Battle of Milne Bay †
- Awards: Distinguished Flying Cross

Peter St George Bruce Turnbull, DFC (9 February 1917 – 27 August 1942) was an Australian fighter ace of World War II, credited with twelve aerial victories. Born in Armidale, New South Wales, he was an electrician before he joined the Royal Australian Air Force (RAAF) in January 1939. After pilot training he was posted to No. 3 Squadron, which departed for action in the Middle East in July 1940. Flying Gloster Gladiator, Hawker Hurricane and P-40 Tomahawk fighters during the North African and Syria-Lebanon campaigns, Turnbull was credited with nine victories and awarded the Distinguished Flying Cross. Posted to the South West Pacific in March 1942, he joined No. 75 Squadron at Port Moresby, New Guinea, operating P-40 Kittyhawks. During the ensuing Battle of Port Moresby, he claimed three Japanese aircraft. Turnbull took over command of No. 76 Squadron in May, leading it into the Battle of Milne Bay later that year. He was killed during a mission on 27 August 1942; an Allied airfield in New Guinea was subsequently named for him.

== Early career ==
The son of Archibald and Maud Turnbull, Peter Turnbull was born on 9 February 1917 in Armidale, New South Wales. After leaving school with an Intermediate Certificate, he was employed as an electrician in Glen Innes, where his family owned property. In 1938, Turnbull enlisted in the 12/24th Light Horse Regiment, a militia unit. He joined the Royal Australian Air Force (RAAF) as an air cadet on 16 January 1939, and underwent instruction at No. 1 Flying Training School in Point Cook, Victoria. Graduating on 20 October 1939, he was commissioned a pilot officer and assigned to No. 3 (Army Cooperation) Squadron, which operated Hawker Demons out of RAAF Station Richmond, New South Wales. He was promoted to flying officer on 20 April 1940, and posted to the Middle East with his unit on 15 July, disembarking at Suez, Egypt, the following month.

== Combat service ==
=== Middle East ===
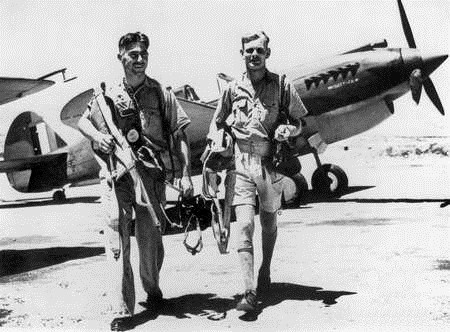
Flying Officer Turnbull (left) with a fellow No. 3 Squadron pilot and a P-40 Tomahawk fighter

During the North African campaign in late 1940, Turnbull undertook close air support in Gloster Gauntlets and fighter missions in Gloster Gladiators. He was credited with probably destroying a Fiat CR.42 during the Battle of Bardia on 26 December, and with damaging a Fiat G.50 on 25 January 1941, the last sortie No. 3 Squadron flew with the Gladiator before converting to Hawker Hurricanes. On 3 April, he claimed four Messerschmitt Bf 110 heavy fighters in a single sortie flying a Hurricane he had christened Ortogo; his commanding officer praised him as "quick to the kill".

After converting to P-40 Tomahawks, No. 3 Squadron took part in the Syria-Lebanon campaign. Turnbull became an ace—the first flying the new fighter—on 15 June 1941, when he destroyed a Vichy French Martin 167 bomber in southern Syria. He shot down two more of the same type over Palmyra less than two weeks later, and followed this up by claiming two Vichy Dewoitine D.520 fighters during escort duty on 10 July. He was promoted to flight lieutenant the same month. With his tally of victories in the Middle East standing at nine, Turnbull was awarded the Distinguished Flying Cross for the 116 operational sorties and 200 hours he had flown, several enemy aircraft destroyed in the air and on the ground, and "magnificent fighting spirit and great skill". The decoration was promulgated in the London Gazette on 10 October 1941, and eventually presented to his father after Turnbull's death. He returned to Australia that November to serve in the South West Pacific.

=== South West Pacific ===
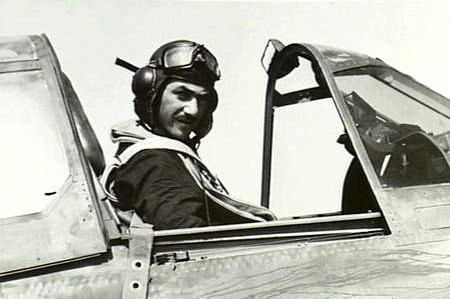
Squadron Leader Turnbull as commander of No. 76 Squadron in New Guinea, 1942

Turnbull was posted to No. 24 Squadron at RAAF Station Archerfield, Queensland, in December 1941. He then served on the staff of No. 3 Service Flying Training School, Amberley, during January and February 1942. In March, he joined No. 75 Squadron in New Guinea as a flight commander under Squadron Leader "Old John" Jackson, another veteran and ace from No. 3 Squadron in the Middle East. Operating P-40 Kittyhawks, No. 75 Squadron quickly became engaged in the defence of Port Moresby, one of the crucial early battles in the New Guinea campaign. Even before seeing combat in the area, Turnbull was shot at. As he brought a flight of four Kittyhawks in to land for the first time at Moresby's Seven Mile aerodrome on 21 March, nervous Australian anti-aircraft gunners opened fire and damaged at least three planes before they landed. The next day, Turnbull took part in a surprise raid against Lae airfield. Five Kittyhawks led by Jackson attacked and destroyed a dozen Japanese planes on the ground, while four others led by Turnbull provided protective cover above; he shot down one of three Mitsubishi Zeros that intercepted the Australian formation. He claimed two further victories during the battle of Port Moresby—a pair of Zeros on 10 April, according to one account—which brought his score to twelve. On 17 April, the commander of No. 76 Squadron, attached to No. 75 for combat experience, was killed in action, resulting in Turnbull being posted back to Australia to take over the former unit.

In May 1942, Turnbull was formally appointed commanding officer of No. 76 (Kittyhawk) Squadron, then based in Townsville, Queensland. He was promoted to acting squadron leader on 8 June. Turnbull returned to New Guinea with No. 76 Squadron on 25 July, arriving at Milne Bay in company with a re-equipped No. 75 Squadron. During the Battle of Milne Bay, Turnbull's unit was engaged in air defence against Japanese raiders and offensive strikes against shipping and other targets in support of Australian ground forces. On 7 August, inclement weather forced Turnbull and another pilot to crash land on Goodenough Island; they were later picked up by an Allied patrol. Nos. 75 and 76 Squadrons attacked the main Japanese invasion convoy as it steamed towards Milne Bay on 25 August. Two days later, Turnbull was patrolling for Japanese tanks with another member of his squadron, Flight Lieutenant Ron Kerville. While diving on an enemy target, his Kittyhawk was seen to flip on to its back at 200 feet (61 m) and crash into the jungle. The cause of the incident was never fully established; ground fire was considered a likely explanation, although mud on the control surfaces, causing a high-speed stall, was also postulated.

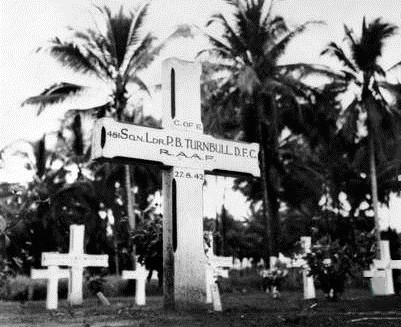
Turnbull's grave in Milne Bay, New Guinea, 1943

Initially posted as missing, Turnbull was confirmed dead on 4 September when troops from the 2/12th Battalion found the wreckage of his plane and his body inside. According to the official history of the Australian Army during World War II, the "soldiers much admired and appreciated the work of the two R.A.A.F. squadrons and, for them, the gallant Turnbull had epitomised the courage and skill of all the airmen". Squadron Leader "Bluey" Truscott took over Turnbull's command. By 7 September the Japanese had withdrawn their troops from the Milne Bay area; Generals Sydney Rowell and Cyril Clowes both described the efforts of Nos. 75 and 76 Squadrons as "the decisive factor" in repulsing the invading forces.

Turnbull was credited with a total of twelve aerial victories during the war, plus one probable and two damaged. Initially buried at Dowa Dowa, Milne Bay, he was subsequently interred in Bomana War Cemetery, Port Moresby. His name appears on panel 104 of the Commemorative Area at the Australian War Memorial, Canberra, and on the Glen Innes Roll of Honour. Milne Bay's No. 3 Airstrip was renamed Turnbull Field in his honour; it marked the furthest westward advance of the Japanese in the area.
