= Naval Base Milne Bay =

World War 2 base in Papua New Guinea

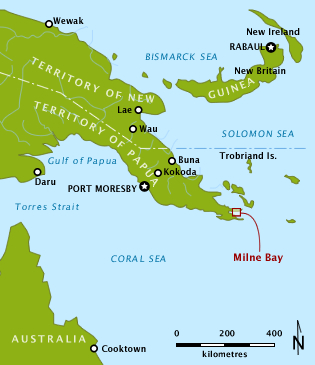
- Location of Naval Base Milne Bay

- Location within Papua New Guinea
- Location: Milne Bay Province
- Coordinates: 10°20′00″S 150°21′04″E
- Ocean/sea sources: Solomon Sea
- Basin countries: Papua New Guinea
- Max. length: 35 km (22 mi)
- Max. width: 15 km (9.3 mi)
- Surface area: 202.7 square miles (525 km^{2})
- Settlements: United States Navy; Naval Base Milne Bay; 1942-1945

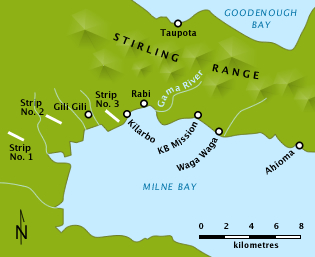
Enlargement of Milne Bay, indicating some key locations.

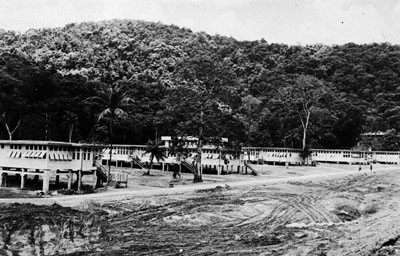
Naval Base Milne Bay, Seabees Advance Base Construction camp on October 10, 1944

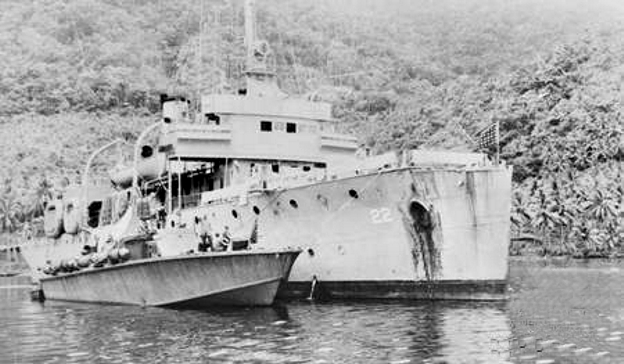
PT boat at Milne Bay, Kana Kopa Base with the USS Tulsa in 1943

Naval Base Milne Bay, also called Naval Advance Base Milne Bay, was new major United States Navy sea and airbase base built on Milne Bay in Milne Bay Province in south-eastern Papua New Guinea. By spring 1943, the build up of the US Navy to support the Pacific War had caused overcrowding at the ports on the east coast of Australia. To help, Seabees departed Naval Base Brisbane on June 19, 1943, to set up a new base in Milne Bay. Naval Base Milne Bay headquarters was at Ladava Navy Base. The Royal Australian Navy already had a small base in Milne Bay: HMAS Ladava. Australians were able to defend and keep Milne Bay in the Battle of Milne Bay in 1942. Naval Base Milne Bay was built during World War II to support the many ships and aircraft fighting and patrolling in the South West Pacific theatre of war. Ladava Navy Base provided a large protective US Navy fleet anchorage at Gahora Bay next to Ladava. At Naval Base Milne Bay, Seabees built a large Naval facility.

== History ==
Naval Base Milne Bay started as a small Royal Australian Navy in 1942 as part of the New Guinea campaign. On May 23, 1943, Seabees of 55th Battalion started construction of a PT boat Advance Base Six on the south side of Milne bay at Kana Kopa, including an engine-overhaul shop. On June 29 and 30, 1943 Naval Base Milne Bay PT boats took part in the attacks on Salamaua Bay and Nassau Bay. The Seabees of the 84th Battalion built Naval Base Milne Bay into a major installation. Seabees built depots for transshipment and staging. Seabees built an overhaul facility for PT boats. Naval Base Milne Bay became a major destroyer base. Milne Bay is 20 miles long, providing a large protected harbor. For land operations, Seabees had to cut into the wet tropical jungle that is the shore of the bay. Seabees built the supply depots near the village of Gamadodo. Malaria was major problem at Naval Base Milne Bay installations, also tropical skin diseases. On July 31, 1943, Seabees started construction on a US Navy seaplane base, 10 miles south of the entrance to Milne Bay at Jenkins Bay. On October 21, 1943, Seabees 91st Battalion arrived at Ladava a replaced 84th Battalion. Seabees 91st Battalion began construction on a destroyer repair base at Gohora Bay, Ladava. An amphibious training center at and large depot was built at Swinger Bay in Alotau. Base Milne Bay was one of a number of staging places for the Battle of Arawe on New Britain. By July 1945 the bases at Naval Base Milne Bay were too far away from the action, and most of the base was packed up by the Seabees and moved to more forward bases in the Philippines and Okinawa.

== Ladava Navy Base ==
Naval Base Milne Bay headquarters was built at Ladava at the west end of Milne Bay, called Ladava Navy Base. For Ladava headquarters, Seabees built: piers, jetties, roads, an electric power station, a communication center, a supply depot, a hospital unit, and barracks for 1,000 troops at 10.333306°S 150.351865°E. Next to Ladava in Gohora Bay was the Fleet anchorage and the destroyer repair depot at 10.351865°S 150.349430°E. Some of the destroyers serviced at the base were: USS Hogan, USS Flusser (DD-368), USS Shaw (DD-373), USS Drayton (DD-366), USS Smith (DD-378), USS Helm (DD-388), USS Mugford (DD-389), USS Warrington (DD-383), USS Taylor (DD-468), USS Daly, and the USS Perkins (DD-377). USS ARD-9 a Auxiliary floating drydock for ship repair arrived at Milne Bay on February 6, 1944. A major PT Boat repair base was built at Ladava. Seabees built a 5-mile road from Ladava Navy Base along the north shore of Milne Bay, linking the north shore bases and ship ports. United States Seventh Fleet used the anchorage at 10.337860°S 150.348164°E and used the bases for staging upcoming sland-hopping campaigns. Submarine chasers, like SC-731 and SC-703, operated out of Naval Base Milne Bay. USS Trinity (AO-13) a fleet oiler was one of the ships that helped the ships at Milne Bay stay on the move. The USS Achilles (ARL-41), a Landing Craft Repair Ship, was at the bay from June 1943 to September 1943. At its peak over 20,000 troops were stationed at Naval Base Milne Bay.

== Kana Kopa PT Boat Base ==
The first Seabee installation built was the PT boat base built at Kana Kopa (Kana Kope) on the south side and near the entrance of Milne Bay at 10.483929°S 150.651824°E. Kana Kopa had been used as anchorage for the Royal Australian Navy in 1942 and supported the August 1942 Battle of Milne Bay. The US Navy PT Boat Advance Base Six opened on December 11, 1942. The 55th Seabees enlarged the PT Boat base on May 23, 1943. Added to the base was: camp for 800 troops, large supply depot, water storage tanks, wharf, pontoon dry docks for repair work, and an engine overhaul depot. USS Oyster Bay (AGP-6), USS Hilo (AGP-2), and USS Wachapreague (AGP-8), operated as PT boat tenders at Kana Kopa in 1944. Naval Base Milne Bay supported a second PT Boat Base on Fergusson Island north of Milne Bay. In June 1944 Seabees moved the base to Dreger Harbour, near Finschafen. Fleet Post Office FPO# 714 SF Kana Kopa, Milne Bay. Fegrusson Island Fleet Post Office FPO# was 523.

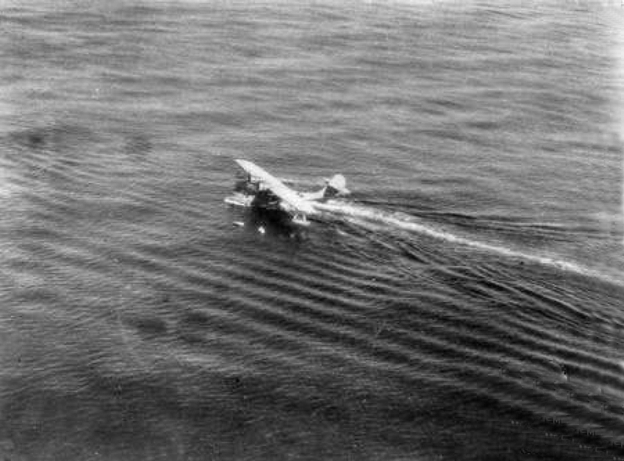
Samarai PBY Catalina rescues a RAAF pilot from Solomon Sea in 1944

== Samarai Seaplane Base ==
Samarai Seaplane Base located on Samarai Island used as a US Navy seaplane base at 10.610046°S 150.661993°E. The seaplane base shore facilities were on Sariba Island, just to the east of Samarai Island at 10.596838°S 150.687925°E. The USS Half Moon, a Seaplane tender, was stationed at the base for support from October 1943 to December 1943. VPB-52 a US Navy Patrol Bombing Squadron stationed at the base. The Seabee 84th Battalion built a plane ramp on Samarai Island. On Sariba Island they built a camp for 270 troops, a small boat pier, communication center, headquarters, mess hall, and aviation-gasoline tank farm, supply depot. A roll of the base was to patrol the shipping lanes to Australia and did reconnaissance work. The night-flying "Black Cat" PBY Squadron, VPB-11, VP-33, VP-34, and cat VP-101 was stationed at the base. The base also operated a crash boat base at the camp, with Rescue Boat C-9485. Fleet PO Box was 421.

== Swinger Bay Alotau Base ==
Amphibious Construction Battalion 2 and 105th Battalion Seabees built a large amphibious training center at Swinger Bay at 10.303806°S 150.413289°E in the city of Alotau. Troops trained in amphibious ship landings, with two programs one for officers and one for troops. The center had quonset hut camp for 1,500 troops, mess hall, vast supply depot, class rooms, a 2,000 foot waterfront. Seabees did a massive grading project to space for the center. The center opened in January 1944. Seventh Amphibious Force moved from Toorbul, Queensland to the Alotau Base in 1944, and in March 1945 moved out of Alotau to U.S. Naval Base Subic Bay. US Army 32d Infantry Division and 41st Infantry Division are some of the units that trained at the center, also the 1st Marine Division. Fleet Post Office FPO#818 SF Stringer Bay, Milne Bay.

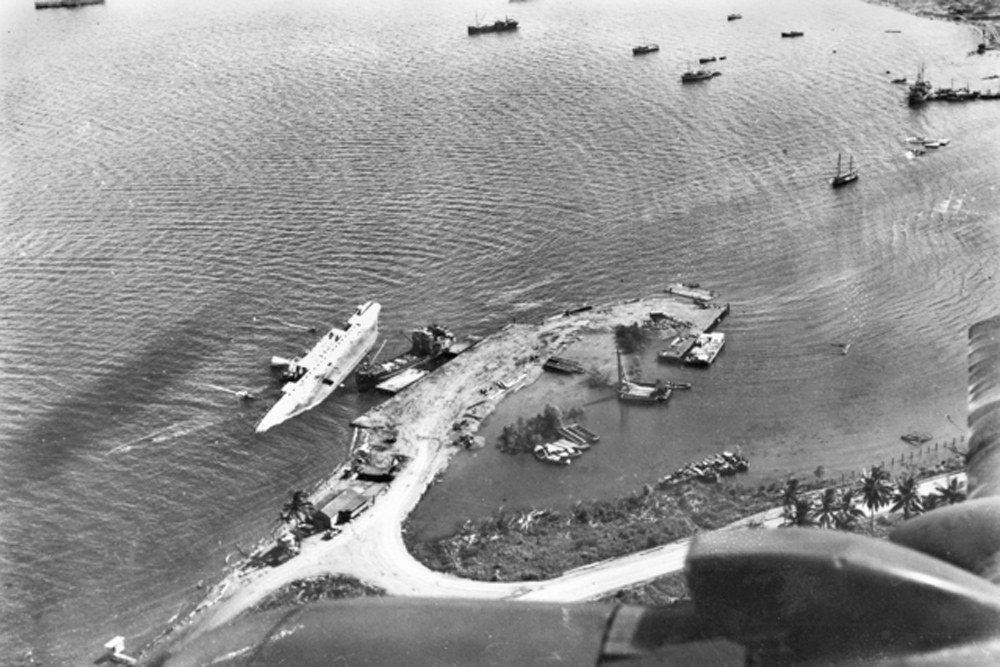
MV Anshun lying on her side at Gili Gili Dock, in Milne Bay, New Guinea, 1942

== Gili Gili Dock ==
Gili Gili Dock was Naval loading and unloading dock, with both a jetty and pontoon wharf at Gili Gili (also spelled Gill Gill). On September 6, 1942, the ship MV Anshun a 1930 ship was sunk at Gili Gili Dock by Japanese cruiser Tenryū. She was refloated and repaired. Gili Gili Base was at 10.316694°S 150.380899°E, just west of Swinger Bay and the Swinger Bay Base. Turnbull Field No. 3 Strip, was inland from the Gili Gili Dock and Swinger Bay Base amphibious training center just to the east of Gili Gili Dock. Gili Gili also became a US Army staging area with a large tent camp. Feet Post Office FPO# 717 SF Gilli Gilli, Milne Bay.

== Gamadodo Center ==
The Gamadodo Center was south of Ladava, at Gamadodo, now called Gibara, at 10.408175°S 150.376330°E. At Gamadodo an Amphibious Construction Battalion 1 built a sawmill to supply lumber to the bases in Milne Bay. As the size of the Naval Base Milne Bay increased more supplies were needed so a cargo pier and a very large depot were built at Gamadodo. Soon Liberty Ships and Victory ships were unloading supplies. Seabees built a large staging camp for 10,000 troops, and a pontoon assembly depot, to assemble pontoons that were shipped in parts to save space on ships. Fleet Post Office FPO# 167 SF Gamadodo, Milne Bay. An ammunition depot was built outside of the camp.

== Milne Bay Submarine Base ==
In late 1943 Milne Bay Submarine Base opened an advanced submarine base with submarines from Naval Base Brisbane. The US Navy submarine tender USS Fulton was stationed at Milne Bay Submarine Base from 29 October 1943 to 17 March 1944.

== Hilimoi Bay hospital ==
Amphibious Construction Battalion 2 built a 500-bed Naval hospital and 3,000 bed rest and recovery center was built at Hilimoi bay on the south side of Milne Bay at 10.41666°S 150.4500°E. Hilimoi is five miles east of Gamadodo depot and center. Also called Hilimoi Mission. The hospital was shipped to a more forward base in July 1945. Fleet Post Office FPO# 817 SF Hilimoi, Milne Bay.

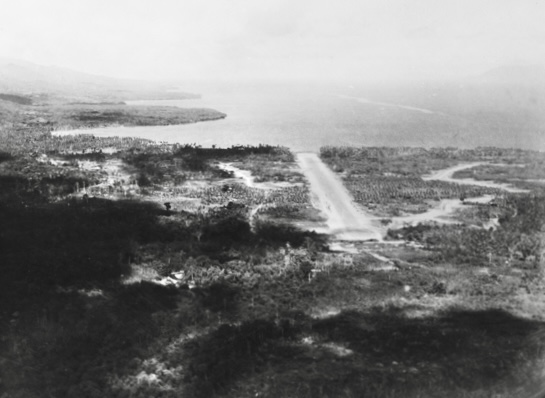
Turnbull Field, No. 3 Airstrip with Stephen's Ridge in the foreground

== Airfields ==
- Gurney Airfield (No. 1 Strip) at Milne Bay, was built by the U.S. Army in 1942 and is now Gurney Airport at 10°18′41″S 150°20′01″E.
- Turnbull Field (No. 3 Strip) was built in 1942 and is located near Gil Gili, just west of Swinger Bay. Now Memorial Park- No. 3 Airstrip at 10.302383°S 150.388901°E.
- Waigani Airfield, No. 2 Strip was built near Waigani on the west end of Milne Bay. Due to poor water drainage, the airfield was abandoned and not used. Airfield was at 10.316667°S 150.25°E.
  - Narewa Airfield, Seabees from Naval Base Milne Bay and other bases were sent out to help build an 3,000-foot runway and airfield on Woodlark Island north of Naval Base Milne Bay, now Guasopa Airport.

== Australian Camps ==
The Australian Armed Forces operated a number of bases in Milne Bay from 1942 to 1945. Some bases: Rabi Camp (also spelled Rabe) was attacked by Japan in 1942. Rabi Camp was on the north shore in Swinger Bay at 10.297247°S 150.409053°E. KB Mission camp (Koebule Mission) was on the north shore east of Rabi Camp at 10.308442°S 150.432485°E, in the city of Alotau. Waga Waga Camp was at 10.415072°S 150.411784°E, on the south shore. At Konibirrubirru Island was an Australian Wireless Spotters Station. Main camp was at HMAS Ladava.

== Outlying bases ==
Naval Base Milne Bay support Outlying naval bases:

- Naval Base Bolubolu Goodenough Island had Navy anchorage and docks. Seabees built small craft wharf, Liberty Ship wharves. There were spots for beach LST Landings. Seabees built shore facilities including: engineering deopt, staging camp and supply depot. A road was built to the Vivigani Airfield, which the base supported. Bolubolu Fleet PO Box as 724.

== Post war ==
Some of the bases were turned into or added to small towns on the bay.

- In Turnbull War Memorial Park in Alotau on Milne Bay is the Milne Bay Memorial. In 2002, the Milne Bay Memorial was improved and rededicated by Australia. Turnbull War Memorial Park has three monuments to those that were killed in the battle in August 1942. Also a battlefield relief map. One of the monuments is in memory of The 61st Battalion, Queensland Cameron Highlanders dedicated to them. The park is at 10.302483°S 150.302483°E.
- Milne Bay War Memorial is a monument at the Masurina Lodge, in Alotau at 10.304918°S 150.454335°E.
- Milne Bay Memorial Library and Research Centre is located in Chermside, Queensland.
- Milne Bay & World War Two Memorial Wall is located in Nundah Memorial Park in Nundah, Queensland at 27.402922°S 153.058734°E.
- Milne Bay Military Museum (currently closed, moving) was in Darling Downs, Queensland.

== Gallery ==
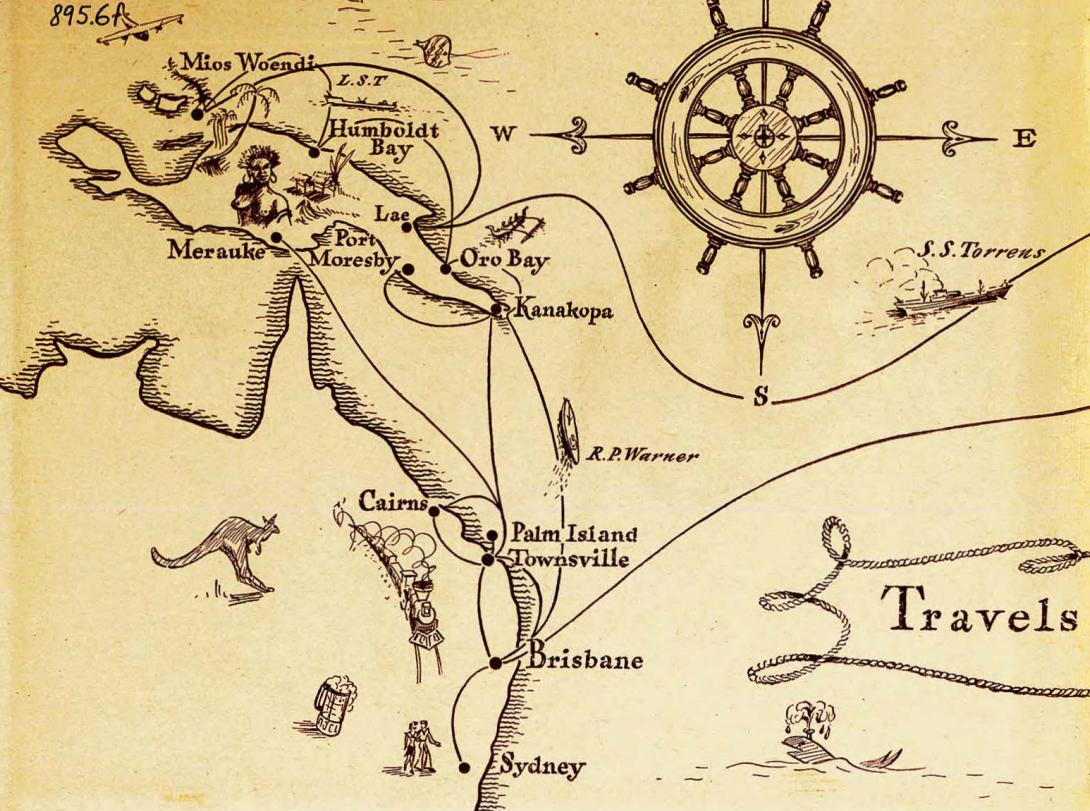
Camp Seabee Naval Base Brisbane, base building trips

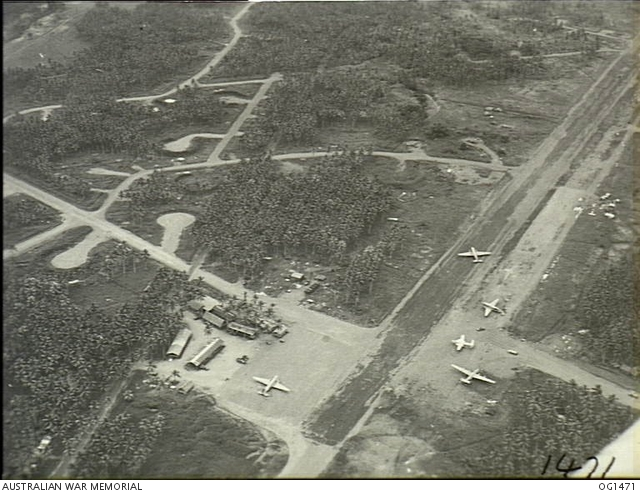
Gurney Airfield in 1944

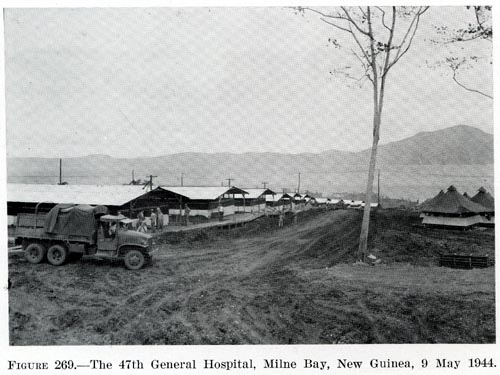
US Army, LLU's 47 General Hospital, Milne Bay

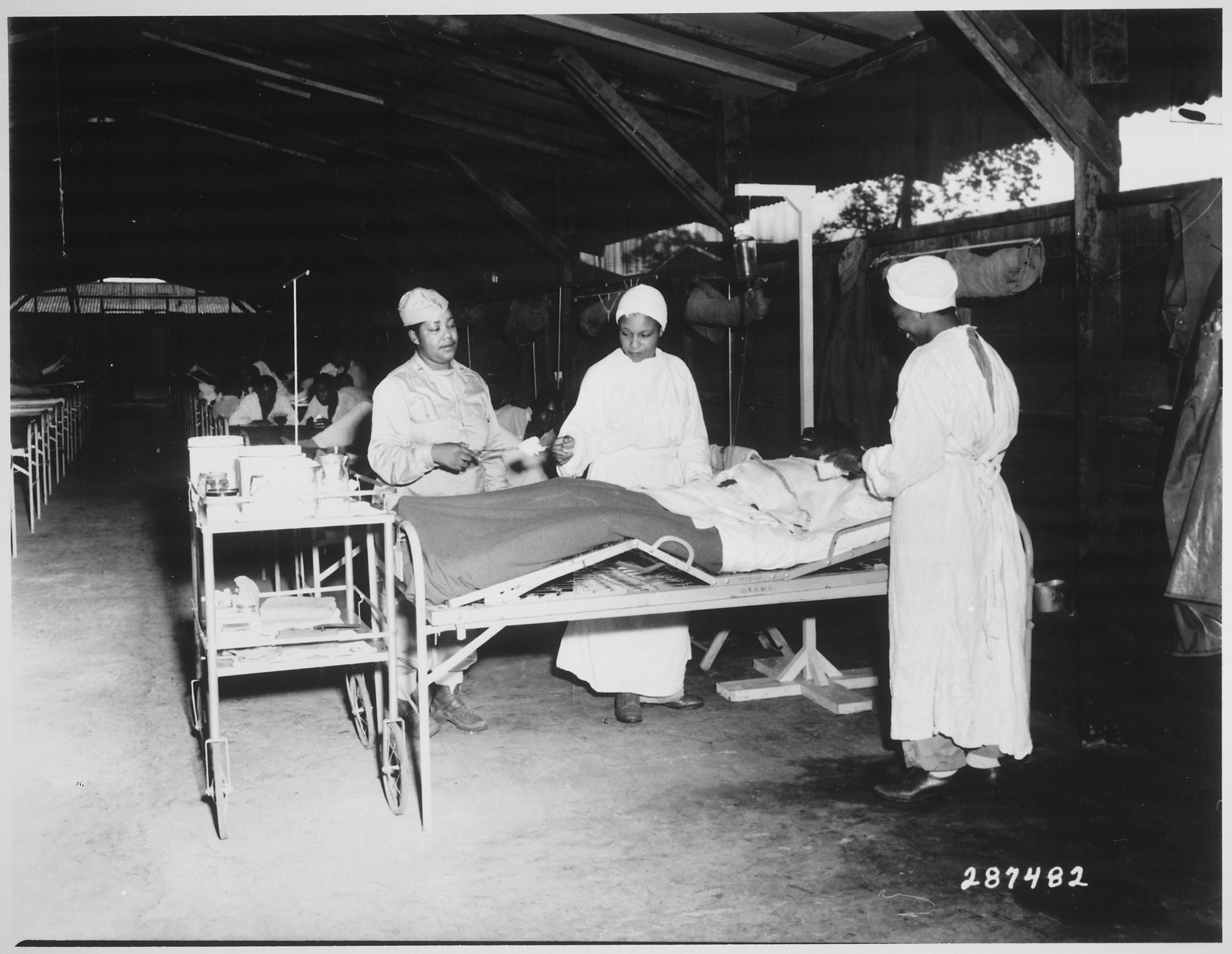
Surgical ward treatment at the 268th Station Hospital, Base A, Milne Bay, Left to right, Sgt. Lawrence McKr

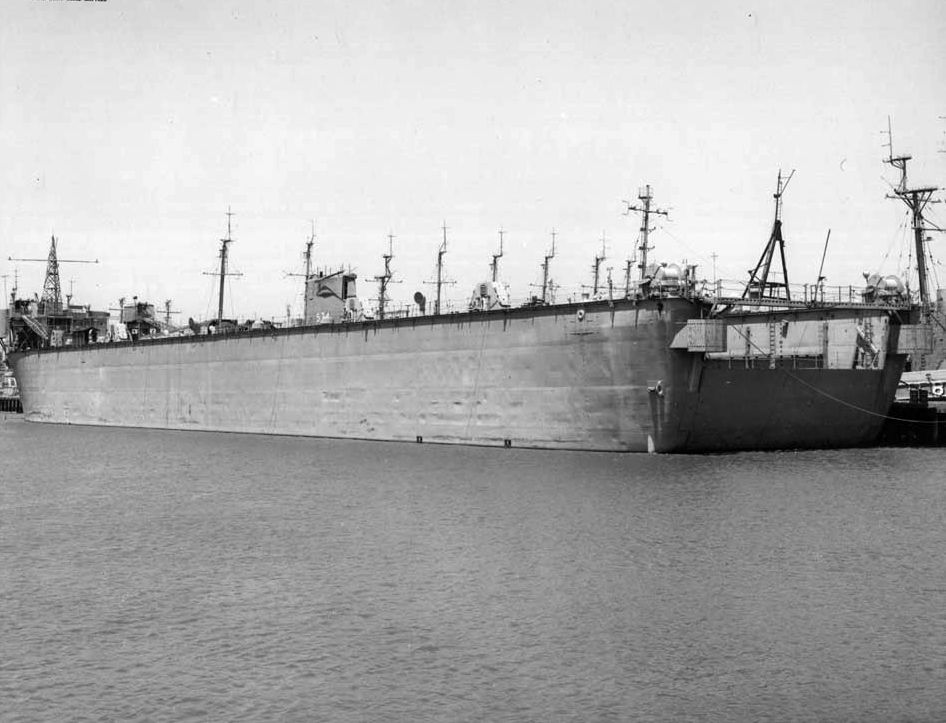
Auxiliary floating drydock, ARD, built by the Pacific Bridge Company

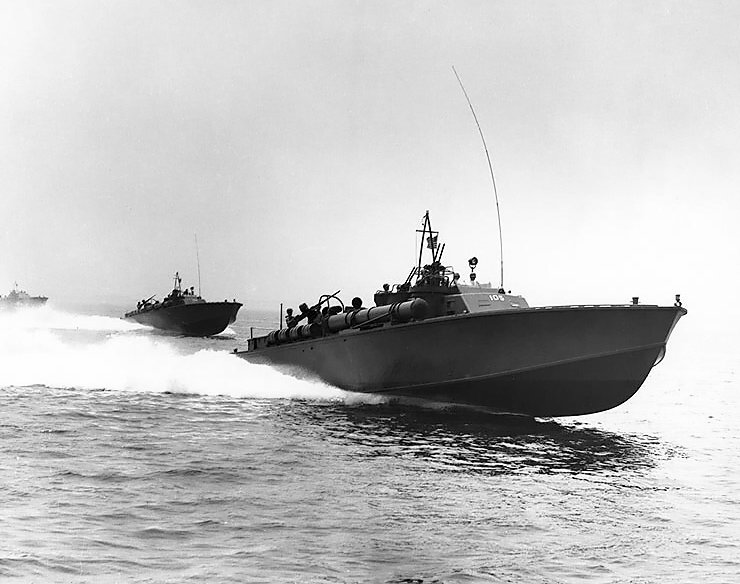
USS PT-105

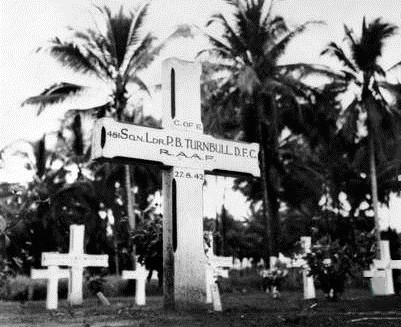
Milne Bay's Turnbull grave in 1943

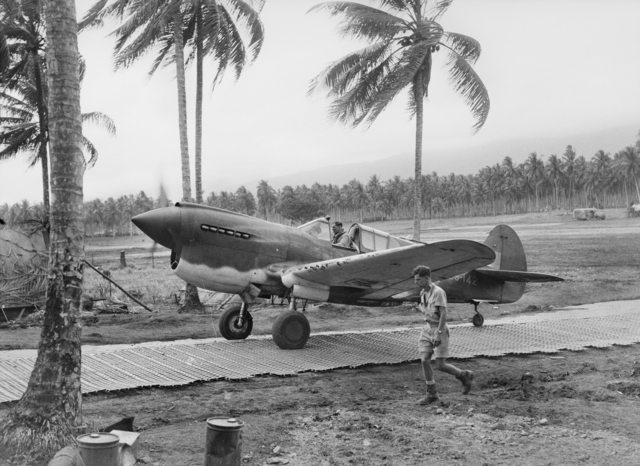
An Australian P-40 at Milne Bay

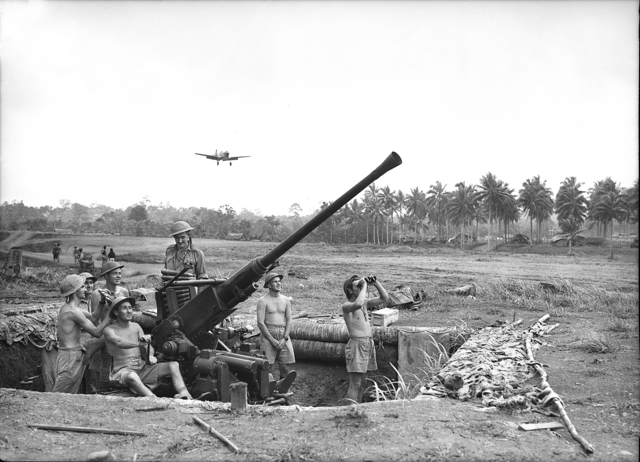
An Australian Bofors 40 mm anti-aircraft gun of the 2/9th Light Anti-Aircraft Battery at Milne Bay No. 1 Airstrip

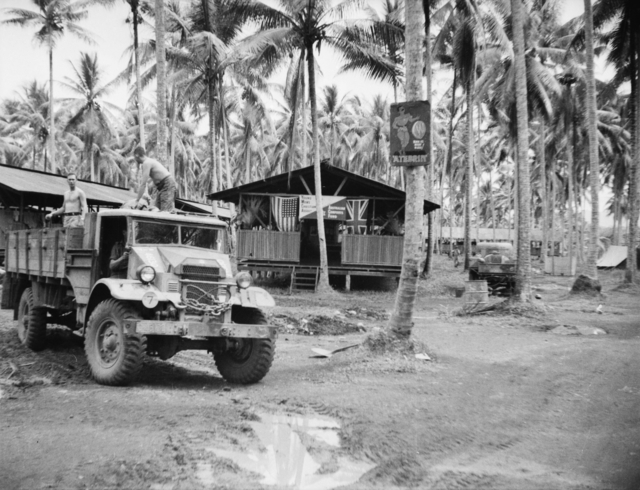
Australian - USA camp at Milne Bay

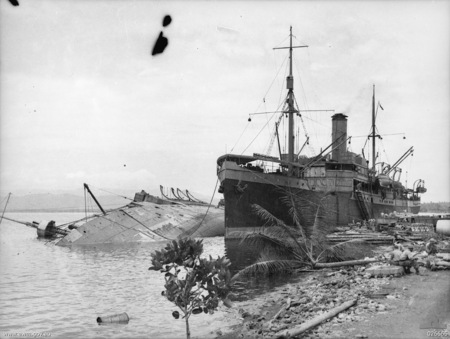
MV Anshun lying on her side at Gili Gili Dock, in Milne Bay, New Guinea, 1942

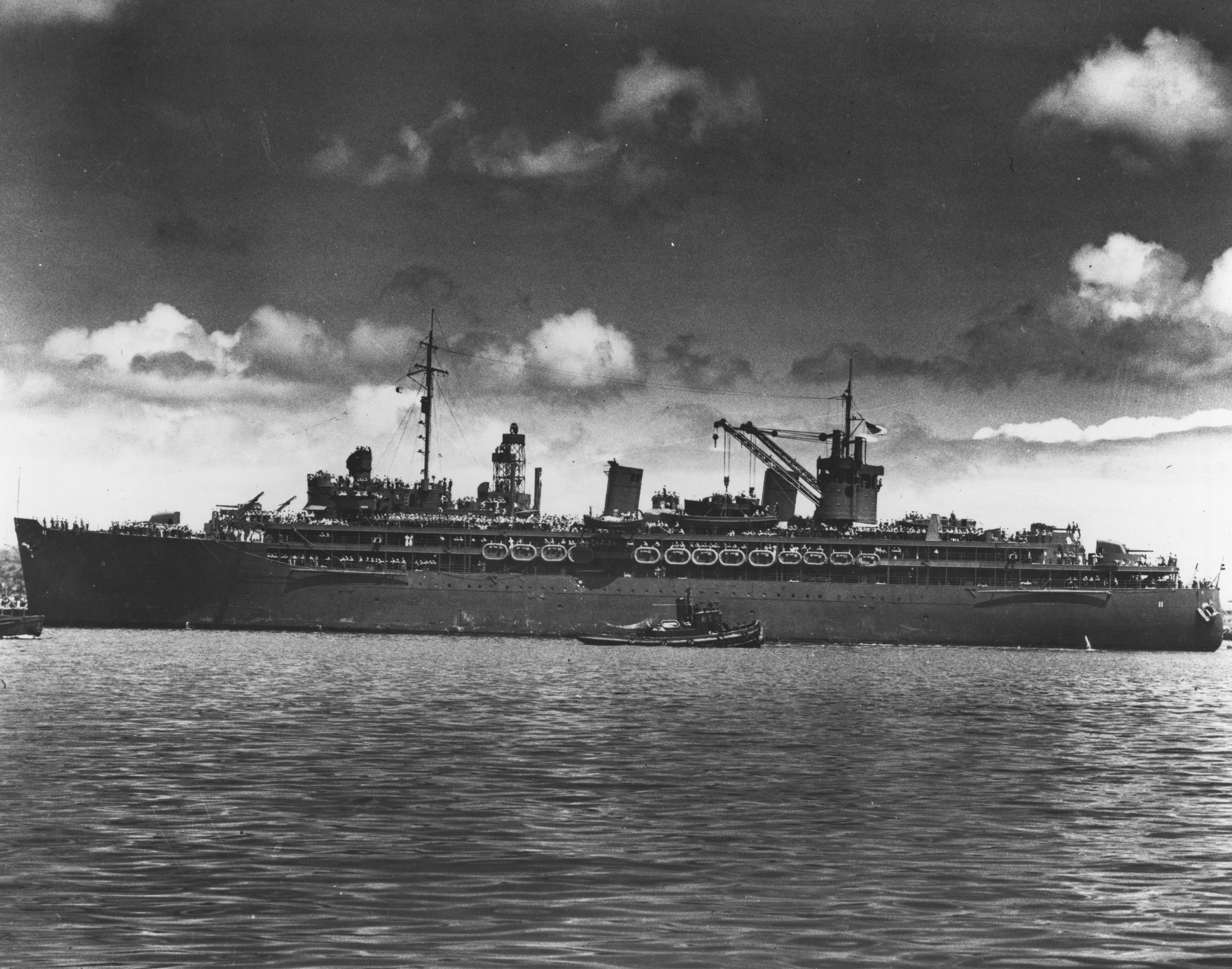
USS Fulton was stationed at the Milne Bay to service submarines

== See also ==
- Naval Base Port Moresby
- Naval Base Woodlark Island
- US Naval Advance Bases
- Naval Advance Base Saipan
- Naval Base Merauke
- Naval Base Finschhafen
- Naval Base Mios Woendi
- Naval Base Lae
- Naval Base Alexishafen
- US Naval Base New Guinea
