= No. 2 Strip Milne Bay =

World War 2 base in Papua New Guinea

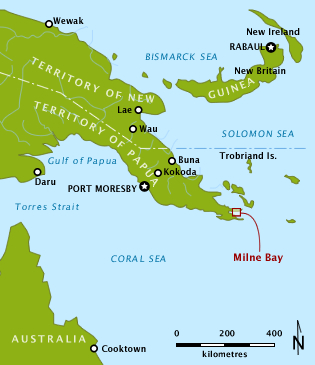
- Location of No. 2 Strip Milne Bay

- Location within Papua New Guinea
- Location: Milne Bay Province
- Coordinates: 10.316667°S 150.25°E
- Settlements: United States Navy; Naval Base Milne Bay; 1942

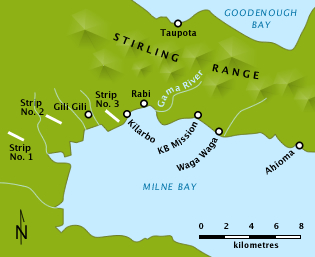
Enlargement of Milne Bay, indicating No. 2 Strip Milne Bay locations.

No. 2 Strip Milne Bay, (Waigani Airfield), was an aerodrome under construction near Waigani village, Milne Bay, Papua New Guinea during World War II as part of Naval Base Milne Bay.

Works at the aerodrome were discontinued due to the site being unsuitable for an aerodrome due to drainage problems. Airfield was at 10.316667°S 150.25°E.
