= Swinger Bay =

Place in Milne Bay Province

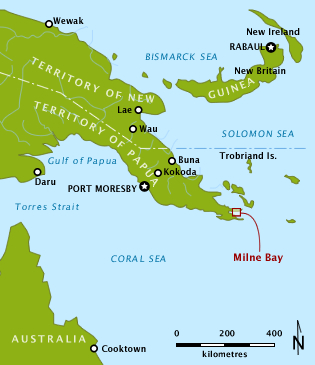
Swinger Bay is in Milne Bay, part of Naval Base Milne Bay

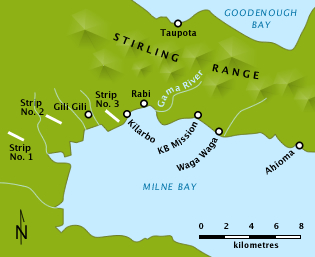
Enlargement of Milne Bay, indicating Swinger Bay location at Rabi

Swinger Bay, is a bay on the north west shore of Milne Bay, in Milne Bay Province, Papua New Guinea. It was named by John Moresby after HMS Swinger. It is also known as Stringer Bay. (Note: "Stringer" is the "approved" U.S. name with "Swinger" the "variant in the official National Geospatial Intelligence Agency Geonames Search results. U.S. military records and histories of the war period use "Stringer" instead of "Swinger" for the bay.)

Swinger Bay, and the city on the bay Alotau, was selected as a site for an amphibious training centre in 1943 during World War II, which relocated from HMAS Assault, Port Stephens, Australia. Construction started in late 1943 by a detachment of the 91st Naval Construction Battalion (Seabees), whose main element had arrived 21 October 1943 from Port Hueneme, California in Sea Witch. The detachment built facilities on a site noted as being high and relatively dry, for about 800 men and 30 officers that included storage, shops, housing, roads, water and electrical systems and a 350 feet (106.7 m) jetty to water of 12 feet (3.7 m) depth. The 91st was relieved by 105th Naval Construction Battalion in January 1944.

The amphibious training centre consisted of housing for 1,500 men in quonset huts and developed 2,000 feet (610 m) on waterfront for training purposes.

Rabi Camp (also spelled Rabe), part of HMAS Ladava, was attacked by Japan in 1942 in the Battle of Milne Bay. Rabi Camp was on the north shore in Swinger Bay at 10.297247°S 150.409053°E.

The Gama River flows into Swinger Bay.

In March 1945, the amphibious training centre closed and relocated to Subic Bay, Philippines.
