= Turnbull Field =

Aerodrome in Papua New Guinea

Coordinates: 10.303699°S 150.388648°E

Turnbull Field
- Part of Fifth Air Force
- Located in Milne Bay Province, Papua New Guinea

Site information
- Type: Military airfield
- Controlled by: United States Army Air Forces

Site history
- Built: 1942
- In use: 1942–1944

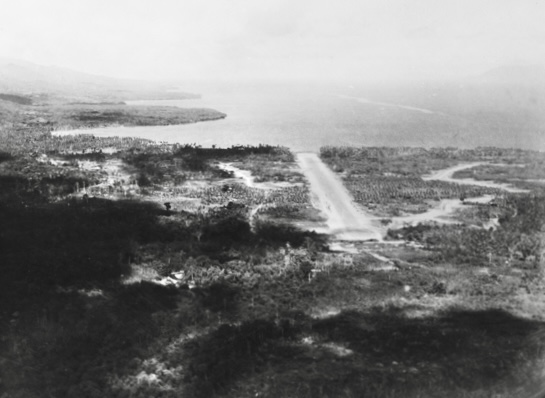
Turnbull Field, No. 3 Airstrip with Stephen's Ridge in the foreground

Turnbull Field was an aerodrome near Gili Gili, Papua New Guinea.

== History ==
Built by the US Army 2nd Battalion of 43rd Engineer General Service Regiment (less Company E), during the Battle of Milne Bay during World War II with assistance from the 105th Naval Construction Battalion. Originally known as No. 3 Strip, the airfield was renamed Turnbull Field on 14 September 1942 in honour of Royal Australian Air Force Squadron Leader Peter Turnbull, who was killed in an aircraft crash. The single runway was 5,000 feet (1,500 m) long x 100 feet (30 m) wide surfaced with marston matting. Taxiways and revetments extended off both sides of the runway.

The aerodrome was abandoned in February 1944 and has been disused since the end of World War II.

=== Allied Units Based at Turnbull Field ===
- 36th Fighter Squadron, 8th Fighter Group (18 September 1942 – 22 February 1943), P-39
- 403d Bombardment Squadron, 43d Bombardment Group (23 November 1942 – 21 January 1943), B-17
- 82d Tactical Reconnaissance Squadron, 71st Tactical Reconnaissance Group (6–23 November 1943), B-25, P-39
- 418th Night Fighter Squadron (2–22 November 1943), P-38, P-70
- 421st Night Fighter Squadron (4 January – 1 February 1944), P-70
- No. 6 Squadron RAAF, (Lockheed Hudson)
- 9 Battery, 2/3 Australian Light Anti-aircraft Regiment

== See also ==
- Naval Base Milne Bay
