= Battle of Goodenough Island =

Pacific battle of World War II

- Part of the New Guinea campaign of the Pacific Theater (World War II)
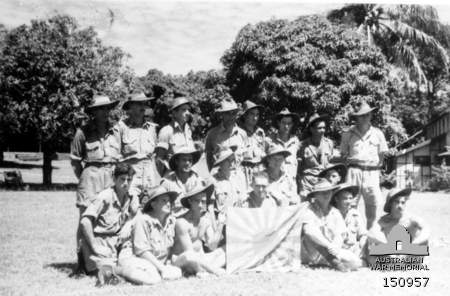
- Australian soldiers with a Japanese flag captured during the fighting at Goodenough Island
Date	22–27 October 1942
Location	Goodenough Island, Territory of Papua; 09°20′25″S 150°16′03″E
Result	Allied victory

Belligerents
Australia; United States	Japan

Commanders and leaders
(Australia) Arthur Arnold (Australia) Keith Gategood	(Empire of Japan) Torashige Tsukioka

Strength
640	353 initially, 285 during ground fighting

Casualties and losses
13 killed, 19 wounded	20 killed, 15 wounded, 1 prisoner

The Battle of Goodenough Island (22–27 October 1942), also known as Operation Drake, was a battle of the Pacific campaign of World War II. The Allies landed on Goodenough Island, Papua, and clashed with a Japanese Kaigun Rikusentai (Special Naval Landing Force). The Japanese troops had been stranded on the island during the Battle of Milne Bay in late August 1942. "Drake Force", consisting of the Australian 2/12th Battalion and attachments, landed on the southern tip of Goodenough Island at Mud Bay and Taleba Bay on 22 October, tasked with denying the Japanese use of the island prior to the Buna campaign. Following a short but intense fight, the Japanese forces withdrew to Fergusson Island on 27 October. After the battle, Goodenough Island was developed into a major Allied base for operations later in the war.

== Background ==
Goodenough Island is the northernmost of the D'Entrecasteaux Islands to the north-east of Papua, separated by the 30-kilometre (19 mi) wide Ward Hunt Strait. The island is 170 kilometres (110 mi) by sea from Milne Bay and 680 kilometres (420 mi) from Port Moresby. Its position along the sea route between Buna and Milne Bay made it strategically important during late 1942. The island is roughly oval shaped, measuring 21 mi (34 km) long and 13 mi (21 km) across. The coastal belt is up to 5 mi (8 km) wide, covered in grasslands and dissected by streams and coastal swamps. The island rises sharply to the central summit of Mount Vineuo, 2,536 metres (8,320 ft) above sea level.

While the western side of the island was covered in rain forest and jungle, there were grassy plains on the north-eastern side covered in kunai and kangaroo grass. These were suitable sites for airfield development, but the best anchorages were at Mud Bay on the south-eastern side, Taleba Bay on the south-western, and Beli Beli Bay on the eastern side. Other sites were obstructed by coral reefs or exposed to the weather, or could only accommodate shallow-draught vessels drawing 12 feet (3.7 m) or less, making them unsuitable for development. The island had no roads, and there was no motor or animal transport. Neither the interior of the island nor the surrounding waters were adequately charted in 1942. Important features were often missing from maps, and the spellings of the names of some features differed from one map to another.

Aircraft and ships travelling between Milne Bay and Buna had to pass close to Goodenough Island. An Allied presence on the island could provide warning of Japanese operations while denying the Japanese the opportunity to conduct operations or surveillance. Goodenough Island also had flat areas suitable for the construction of emergency airstrips.

== Prelude ==
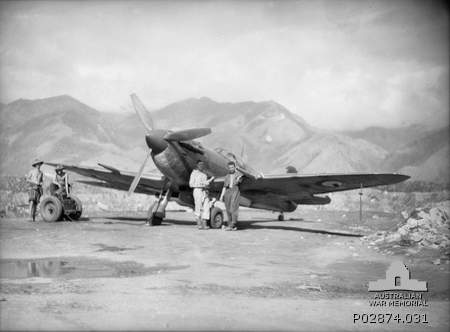
The pilot and support crew of a No. 79 Squadron RAAF Spitfire Mk Vc on Goodenough Island, July 1943

In early August 1942, a small detachment of an American fighter control squadron had been stationed on Goodenough Island to provide advance warning to the Australian fighters based at Milne Bay. On 7 August, five Royal Australian Air Force (RAAF) P-40 Kittyhawks of No. 76 Squadron made forced landings on the grassy plains. One crashed on landing and had to be written off, but after makeshift airstrips were cut through the grass, the remaining four were able to fly out again.

On 24 August, seven landing craft carrying 353 Japanese Special Naval Landing Forces troops of Commander Torashige Tsukioka's 5th Sasebo Special Naval Landing Force, supplemented by a few engineers of the 14th and 15th Pioneer Units (Setsueitai), set out from Cape Nelson in the dark to participate in the attack on the Allied forces at Milne Bay. Upon reaching Goodenough Island they were unable to locate a suitable hiding place during the day for their landing craft, which had to be left on the beach, where the Allies discovered them. A coastwatcher at Cape Nelson reported the Japanese movements, and Milne Bay received a report around midday on 25 August that Japanese were on the west coast of Goodenough Island. Nine Kittyhawks from No. 75 Squadron RAAF were despatched to investigate. They located the landing craft and destroyed all seven, along with the Japanese force's radio and most of its stores. The air raid killed eight Japanese; the survivors, lacking transport, were stranded. Meanwhile, the American detachment on Goodenough Island destroyed its own radios and withdrew from the island.

News of what had occurred on Goodenough Island reached the Japanese command on 9 September via an orderly who had made his way back to Buna in a canoe. The destroyers Yayoi and Isokaze set out from Rabaul to rescue the men on 10 September. Allied aircraft sighted them the next day. The destroyers USS Selfridge, Bagley, Henley and Helm, under Captain Cornelius W. Flynn, USN, were detached from Task Force 44 to intercept. They did not locate the Japanese destroyers, but five Boeing B-17 Flying Fortresses did. Isokaze escaped, despite a near-miss, but Yayoi sank after taking a direct hit on the stern that set her on fire. Her survivors reached Normanby Island, where they found themselves in a similar predicament to their compatriots on Goodenough Island. After the attack, Isokaze returned to the area where Yayoi had gone down, finding an oil slick, but no survivors. On 22 September, Isokaze returned again, this time with the destroyer Mochizuki, and together they found ten survivors in a launch. The two destroyers then searched the coast of Normanby Island without success. The next day a patrol plane spotted another ten survivors, who were rescued on 26 September.

The presence of shipwrecked Japanese sailors on Normanby Island presented no military threat to the Allied forces at Milne Bay, who had repulsed the Japanese landing there earlier, but Captain A. T. Timperley, the Australian New Guinea Administrative Unit (ANGAU) officer responsible for the D'Entrecasteaux and Trobriand Islands, argued that they posed a threat to the indigenous population and Australia's reputation as its protector. C Company, 2/10th Infantry Battalion, under the command of Captain J. Brocksopp, was ordered to land on Normanby Island. Leaving Gili Gili on the destroyer HMAS Stuart on 21 September, Brocksopp's company landed at Nadi Nadi on 22 September, and experienced no opposition. It took eight Japanese as prisoners before returning to Milne Bay on Stuart on 23 September.

Meanwhile, messages and food supplies had been air dropped by the Japanese to their troops on Goodenough on 23 September. On 3 October, the submarine I-1 arrived at Goodenough Island, and dropped off rations, ammunition, medical supplies, a radio, and a landing craft. It took 71 sick or wounded men, all it could carry, back to Rabaul, along with the bodies of 13 dead. This left 285 Japanese troops on the island, most of whom were suffering from malaria. I-1 returned on 13 October with more rations and medical supplies and a second landing craft, but an Allied aircraft that dropped a flare drove her off. On 15 October, the Japanese received a radio message warning that the Allies were showing considerable interest in Goodenough Island and were likely to invade.

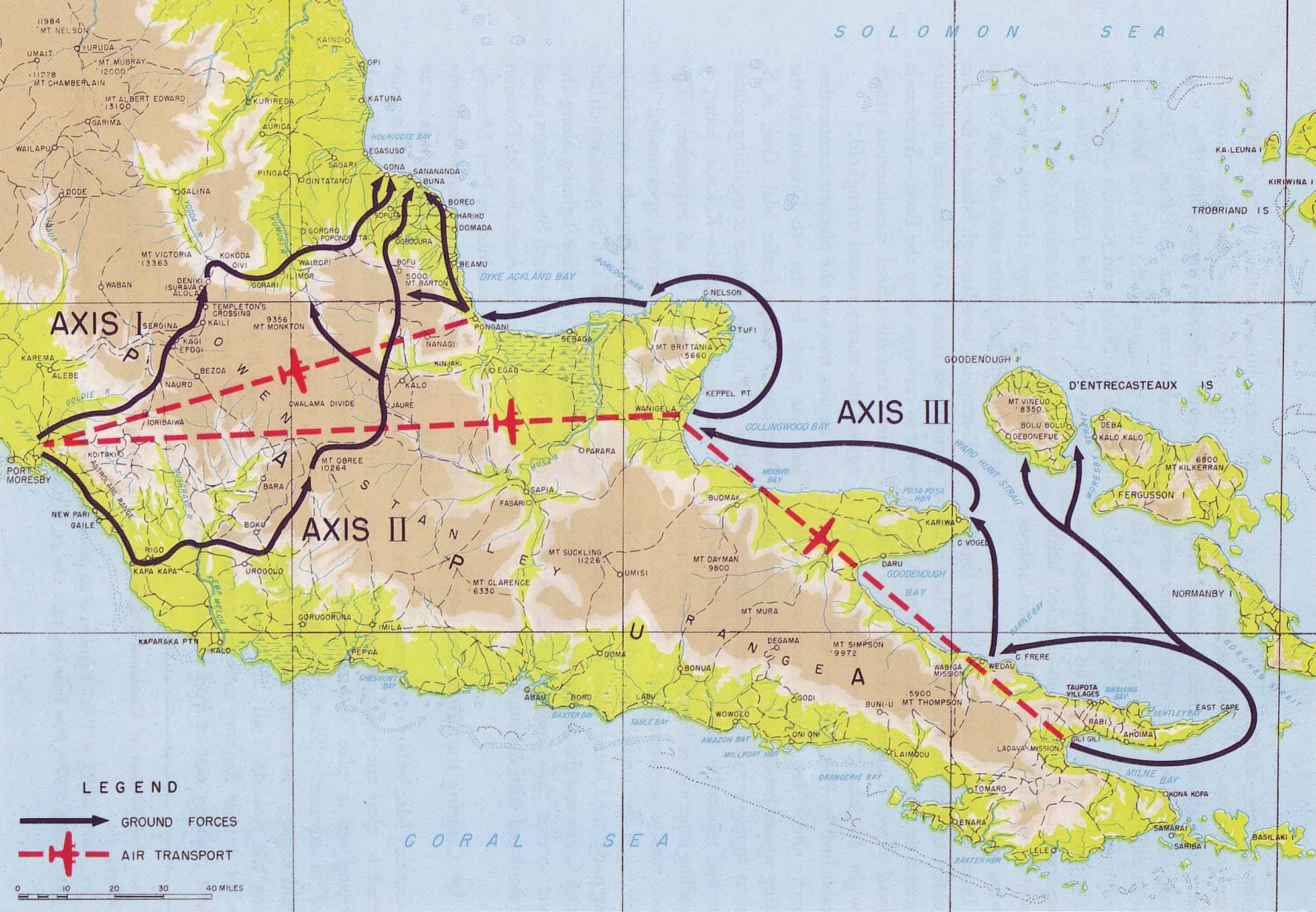
General MacArthur's plan of advance on Buna-Gona, October 1942. Goodenough Island lies on Axis III.

The Allied Supreme Commander of the South West Pacific Area, General Douglas MacArthur, issued new orders on 1 October:

Our Forces in the Southwest Pacific Area [will] attack with the immediate objective of driving the Japanese to the northward of the Kumusi River line. The New Guinea Force will:

1. Advance along the axes Nauro–Kokoda–Wairopi and Rigo–Dorobisolo–Jaure–Wairopi and/or Abau–Namudi–Jaure–Wairopi Trail, both inclusive, with the objective of securing the line of the Kumusi River from Awalama Divide to the crossing of the Kokoda–Buna Trail, both inclusive.
2. Occupy and hold Goodenough Island and the north coast of Southeastern New Guinea south of Cape Nelson in such force as to deny these areas to the Japanese forces.
3. Upon securing these objectives, all land forces will prepare for further advance to secure the area Buna–Gona upon further orders of this Headquarters.

== Battle ==
As part of an operation codenamed "Drake", the 2/12th Infantry Battalion, a Second Australian Imperial Force unit from the 18th Infantry Brigade, which was composed mainly of men from Queensland and Tasmania, was selected to invade Goodenough Island, having taken part in the fighting around Milne Bay in August and September. Its commanding officer, Lieutenant Colonel Arthur Arnold, as the commander of Drake Force, was ordered to destroy the Japanese force there, re-establish the coastwatching and radar warning posts, and reconnoitre the island for airfield sites. Intelligence reports indicated that there were approximately 300 Japanese troops on the island, mainly concentrated in the Galaiwau Bay–Kilia Mission area in the south-east. The Japanese were believed to be short of food and ammunition, and suffering from malnutrition and disease.

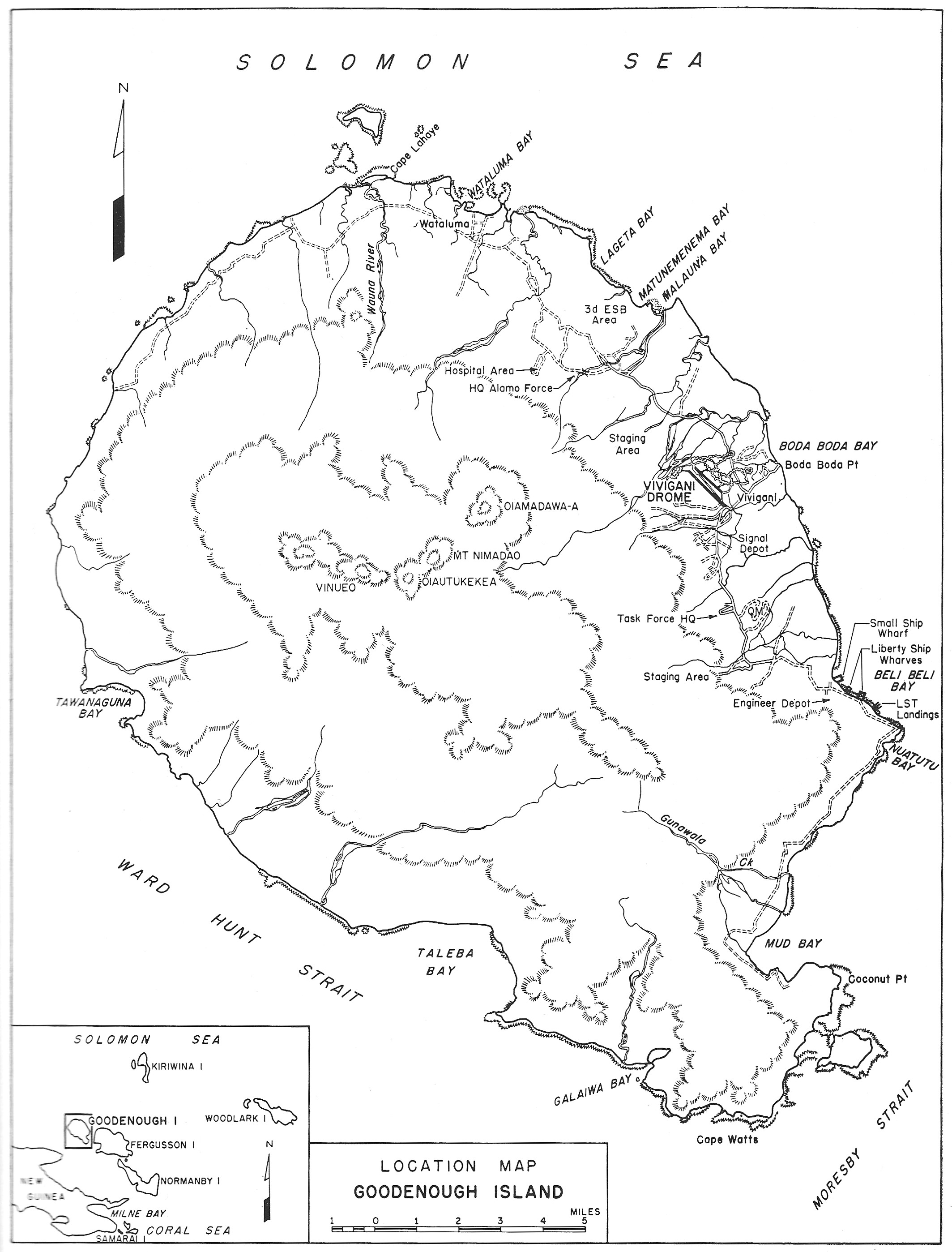
Map of Goodenough Island, showing sites of wartime base development

Boarding the destroyers HMAS Stuart and Arunta in Milne Bay on 22 October, the Australian troops were transported to Goodenough Island escorted by Task Force 44. Arriving that night, the battalion disembarked on both sides of the island's southern tip. Arnold planned to trap the Japanese between the main force of 520 men commanded by himself that landed at Mud Bay, and a smaller one of 120 men, mostly from C Company, commanded by Major Keith Gategood, which landed at Taleba Bay, about 6 mi (10 km) away. Australian landing craft were unavailable, but the 2/12th Infantry Battalion had three ketches, the Matoma, Maclaren King and Tieryo, three Japanese landing craft that had been captured in the Battle of Milne Bay, and two powered whaleboats. Seven days' rations were carried on these craft, and another seven days' on the two destroyers. Each man carried three days' rations.

Drake Force had two AWA 3B Wireless Sets for maintaining communication with Milne Force. One was taken to Mud Bay while the other remained on Arunta. Two Army No. 101 Wireless Sets enabled battalion headquarters to communicate with Mud Bay. Each company had an Army No. 108 Wireless Set to talk to battalion headquarters.

The Mud Bay force travelled in Arunta and came ashore at around 23:00 in the Maclaren King, two of the ship's launches, the three Japanese landing craft and the two powered whaleboats. A base was established at Mud Bay, where a dressing station was prepared and heavy equipment, including all but one 2-inch mortar per company, was cached. The Australians then set out on a gruelling march to Kilia, guided by Papuan policemen. As they moved off, a violent thunderstorm broke, and it started to rain heavily. The force pushed on toward Kilia, but made slow progress that night due to the steep terrain and heavy rain. They were still half a mile (0.8 km) from Kilia at 08:30 on 23 October, when they encountered the Japanese.

The Australians were crossing a creek that was in front of a steep hill. The Japanese commander waited until the Australians were almost at his position before opening fire with machine guns and mortars. The troops who had crossed the creek found hand grenades were being rolled down the hill at them; those behind it were pinned down by heavy and accurate fire. Arnold decided to pull back. That night, he formed a defensive position, and beat off a small Japanese attack.

Meanwhile, the Taleba Bay force on Stuart transferred to Tieryo, a ship's launch and a ship's whaleboat, and was ashore by 03:30 on 23 October. They captured a Japanese machine gun position at about 06:00. Two platoons went south where they were engaged by Japanese forces. The Japanese were driven beyond Niubulu Creek, but a heavy Japanese counterattack from the north at 09:00 inflicted casualties on the Australians and forced them to withdraw from the area. Gategood broke radio silence and attempted to contact Arnold on the 108 set, but was unable to reach him. After this, they came under heavy mortar and machine gun fire, which inflicted heavy casualties. Having lost six men killed and ten wounded, with three more posted as missing, the Australians were forced to fall back under pressure from the pursuing Japanese. Lieutenant Clifford Hoskings later received the Military Cross for silencing a Japanese machine gun in the ensuing fighting. Faced with being overrun, Gategood withdrew his force even further, at first back to Taleba Bay, and then to Mud Bay aboard Stuart, arriving on 24 October.

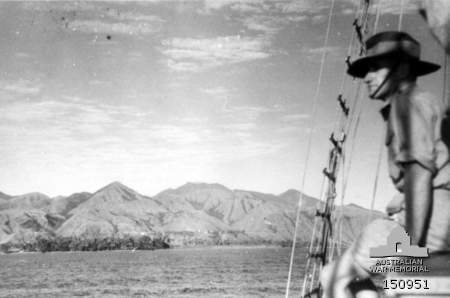
Goodenough Island, seen in November 1942 from the ketch Maclaren King, which acted as a ferry between Milne Bay and Goodenough Island

Gategood could not get through on the radio because the petrol generator that supplied power to the radios at Mud Bay had broken down, thereby cutting Arnold's link with Mud Bay, Milne Force and Taleba Bay. Arnold launched an attack on Kilia at 09:10, supported by two three-inch mortars and a hundred rounds that had been brought up from Mud Bay. A promised air strike failed to arrive. Instead, Japanese aircraft strafed the Australian positions, as well as the ketch Maclaren King in Mud Bay with wounded men on board, causing further casualties. Arnold attempted a flanking movement with A Company, but it became lost in the jungle. The attack then became a frontal one against the main Japanese defences, which Arnold chose not to press.

With the Australian forces unable to advance, the Japanese withdrew during the night. They were transported, along with their equipment and supplies, by their two landing craft to Fergusson Island, where they arrived at dawn on 25 October. From there, 261 men were collected by the light cruiser Tenryū the following day. The 2/12th Infantry Battalion then pressed on from Kilia to Galaiwai Bay, meeting no resistance and finding well-prepared but unmanned defences.

The bombing and strafing of villages by the Allied Air Forces caused some 600 Goodenough Islanders to flee to Fergusson Island, where Timperley's ANGAU detachment had set up a refugee camp and was caring for them until the fighting was over and they could safely return. Australian losses on Goodenough Island were 13 killed in action or died of wounds, and 19 wounded. The Japanese suffered 20 killed and 15 wounded during the battle, but the 2/12th counted 39 dead. However, this was only an estimate as the Japanese had been able to retrieve and bury their dead, which had made it difficult for the Australians to accurately determine their casualties. Despite the evacuation, some Japanese were left behind. One was captured by islanders on 30 October and handed over to Timperley. Two died from malaria in November 1942, and another, Shigeki Yokota, evaded capture until he was taken prisoner in July 1943.

== Aftermath ==
=== Deception ===
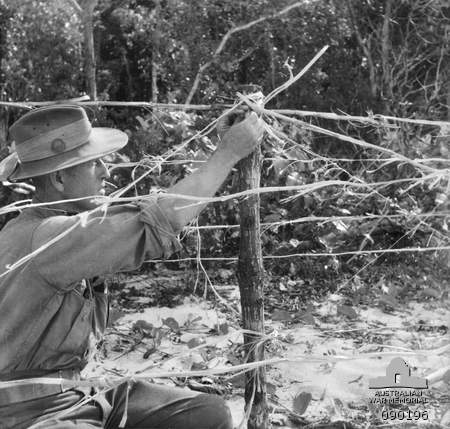
Imitation barbed wire entanglements made from jungle creepers. Bluff and deception were used to mislead the Japanese to thinking that at least one brigade occupied the island.

Two American officers, one each from the Air Corps and the Corps of Engineers, had accompanied the 2/12th Infantry Battalion's landing on Goodenough Island with the mission of locating suitable sites for airbases and air warning facilities. They found good sites around Vivigani and Wataluma. The Vivigani site was cleared by local labourers who established a 4,000-foot (1,200 m) by 100-foot (30 m) emergency fighter landing strip. The 1st Battalion, 91st Engineer General Service Regiment, was assigned the task of developing Vivigani Airfield into a major airbase capable of handling heavy bombers. The 2/12th Infantry Battalion remained on the island until the end of December, eventually being shipped to Oro Bay on the night of 28–29 December to join the attack on Buna on 31 December, leaving 75 men behind. The American engineers were withdrawn to Port Moresby.

Without the engineers, the plans to develop Goodenough Island had to be postponed. Owing to the strategic importance of the island for the forthcoming operations against the Imperial Japanese forces in the South West Pacific Area, the small Australian occupation force used deception and camouflage to make the Japanese believe that a brigade-sized force occupied the island. They fabricated dummy structures, including a hospital, anti-aircraft guns constructed of simple logs pointed at the sky, and barricades of jungle vines which looked like barbed wire. They also lit fires to appear as cooking fires for large numbers of soldiers, and sent messages in easily broken codes consistent with a brigade.

=== Garrison ===
A new garrison, the Australian 47th Infantry Battalion, a Militia unit under the command of Lieutenant Colonel Henry Tasker, arrived from Milne Bay on 4 March 1943. This became the major component of Drake Force, which also included a company of the 4th Field Ambulance, C Troop of the 2/10th Field Battery, B Troop of the 2/17th Light Anti-Aircraft Battery, a section of the 11th Field Company, and detachments of signals, workshop and camouflage units. In all, Drake Force had a total strength of about 720 men. On 5 and 6 March, Japanese bombers attacked ships in the anchorage, and the airstrip and village at Vivigani. They wounded two men, but caused no damage.

In the aftermath of the Battle of the Bismarck Sea, Japanese troops and sailors were again shipwrecked on Goodenough Island. Responding to reports from ANGAU, the police and civilian informants, patrols searched the island for Japanese survivors. In a week of vigorous patrolling between 8 and 14 March 1943, the 47th Infantry Battalion located and killed 72 Japanese, captured 42, and found another nine dead on a raft. A remarkable coup was achieved by a patrol under Captain Joseph Pascoe that killed eight Japanese who had landed in two flat-bottomed boats. In the boats they found documents in sealed tins. On translation by the Allied Translator and Interpreter Section, one document turned out to be a copy of the Japanese Army List, with the names and postings of every officer. It, therefore, provided a complete order of battle of the Japanese Army, including many units never previously reported. Moreover, a mention of any Japanese officer could now be correlated with his unit. Copies were made available to intelligence units in every theatre of war against Japan.

=== Base development ===
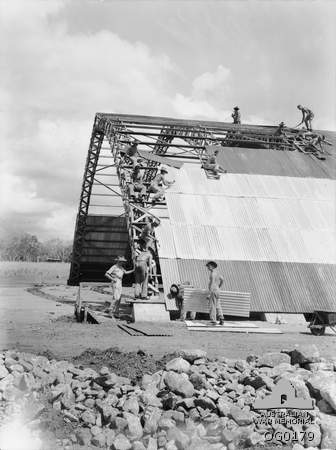
Work in progress on the roof during the construction of an "igloo" hangar by members of No. 7 Mobile Works Squadron RAAF

A four-man survey party from No. 5 Mobile Works Squadron RAAF arrived on Goodenough Island on 3 January 1943. They selected Beli Beli Bay as a suitable site for an anchorage. Here, a 5,000-ton (14,000 m^{3}) ship could anchor half a mile offshore with some degree of shelter from the south-east and north-west. A member of the survey team and a hundred local workers recruited by ANGAU began constructing a jetty at Beli Beli Bay and improving the foot track to Vivigani. An advance party of 54 men from No. 5 Mobile Works Squadron arrived on 27 February 1943.

Plans for Operation Chronicle, the invasion of Woodlark and Kiriwina Islands, called for fighter cover from Goodenough Island. The operation was scheduled for June 1943, so the pace of construction work was accelerated. The rest of No. 5 Mobile Works Squadron arrived in late March, followed by No. 7 Mobile Works Squadron in April. A 5,100-foot (1,600 m) fighter strip was completed and sealed with a mixture of gravel and bitumen. P-40 Kittyhawks of No. 77 Squadron RAAF arrived on 12 June. It was joined by Nos. 76 and 79 Squadrons RAAF on 16 June, and No. 73 Wing RAAF assumed control of the three fighter squadrons on the island. A 6,000-foot (1,800 m) by 100-foot (30 m) bomber strip was completed on 20 October, although No. 30 Squadron RAAF had already commenced operations from the strip on 10 October. Work on the airbase at Vivigani continued until November, by which time there were taxiways and dispersal areas for 24 heavy and 60 medium bombers, and 115 fighters. No. 7 Mobile Works Squadron also built two wharves for Liberty ships.

The island, now codenamed "Amoeba", became a staging point and supply base for operations in New Guinea and New Britain, and USASOS Sub Base C was established on the island on 27 April 1943. Sub Base C was abolished in July when responsibility for Goodenough Island passed to Alamo Force, whose headquarters opened on Goodenough Island on 15 August. From there, it directed operations in the Battles of Arawae and Cape Gloucester, and the landing at Saidor.

In August 1943, Goodenough Island was chosen as the site for a number of hospitals to treat casualties incurred as Allied forces advanced through the Pacific. Work on the 750-bed 360th Station Hospital commenced on 15 September 1943, followed by the 1,000-bed 9th General Hospital on 4 November. A staging area for 60,000 troops was also established on the island. Thousands of American troops later passed through Goodenough Island before the base was closed at the end of 1944.

== See also ==
- Battle of Goodenough Island order of battle
