= Mud Bay =

Mud Bay may refer to:

== Places ==
- Mud Bay, Alaska
- Mud Bay, British Columbia
- Mud Bay, Goodenough Island, New Guinea
- Mud Bay, Kitsap County, Washington, United States, on the Kitsap Peninsula
- Mud Bay, Thurston County, Washington, United States

== Companies ==
- Mud Bay (store), a pet store in the Pacific Northwest

== See also ==
- Blue Mud Bay, Northern Territory, Australia
- Bay mud, thick deposits of silty clay saturated with water
