= Vivigani Airfield =

Airstrip on Goodenough Island in Papua New Guinea

Vivigani Airport
- IATA: VIV; ICAO: none

Summary
- Airport type: Public
- Location: Vivigani, Goodenough Island, Papua New Guinea
- Coordinates: 9°18′23″S 150°19′12″E
- Interactive map of Vivigani Airport

Runways
Direction	Length		Surface
Direction	ft	m	Surface
			Asphalt

Vivigani Airfield (IATA: VIV) was an airstrip at Vivigani on Goodenough Island, part of the D'Entrecasteaux Islands in Papua New Guinea.

== History ==
=== World War II ===
The Australian 2/12th Battalion reached Vivigani on 27 October 1942, occupying the island after defeating the Imperial Japanese troops marooned on the island during World War II.

The Royal Australian Air Force (RAAF) prepared the airfields, first building an emergency landing strip in April 1943. A road was built from the Vivigani docks to the airfield. The first use of the airfield was by 6 Bristol Beauforts of No. 100 Squadron RAAF, staging out of Gurney Airfield, Milne Bay for a strike on Gasmata, Papua New Guinea on 17 May 1943.

No. 5 Mobile Works Squadron worked on the airfield between February and November 1943 and was joined by No. 7 Mobile Works Squadron RAAF between June and September 1943. The airfield consisted of two parallel runways 6,600 feet (2,000 m) long and 150 feet (46 m) wide.

The airfield was used by both the 5th Air Force and the RAAF.

==== Units Based at Vivigani during World War II ====
- No. 6 Squadron RAAF (Bristol Beauforts)
- No. 8 Squadron RAAF (Bristol Beauforts)
- No. 22 Squadron RAAF (Bostons)
- No. 30 Squadron RAAF (Bristol Beaufighters (Strike/Attack Fighter models Mk.1c, Mk.VIc, Mk.XIc and Mk.Xc)
- No. 77 Squadron RAAF (P-40's)
- No. 79 Squadron RAAF (Spitfire)
- No. 100 Squadron RAAF (Bristol Beauforts)
- No. 108 Communication Unit RAAF (PBY Catalinas)
- No. 7 Mobile Works Squadron RAAF

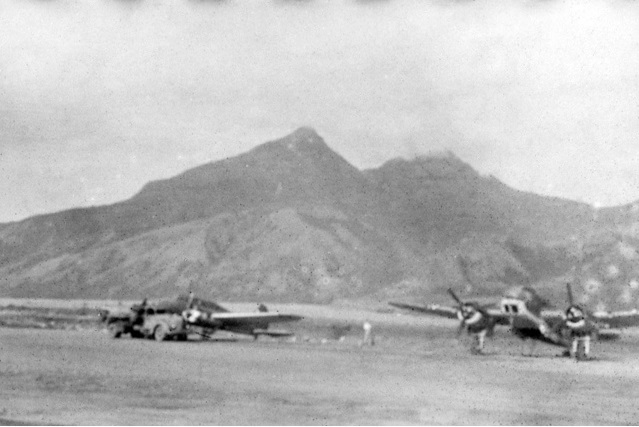
RAAF aircraft Goodenough Island (AWM image P02875-154)

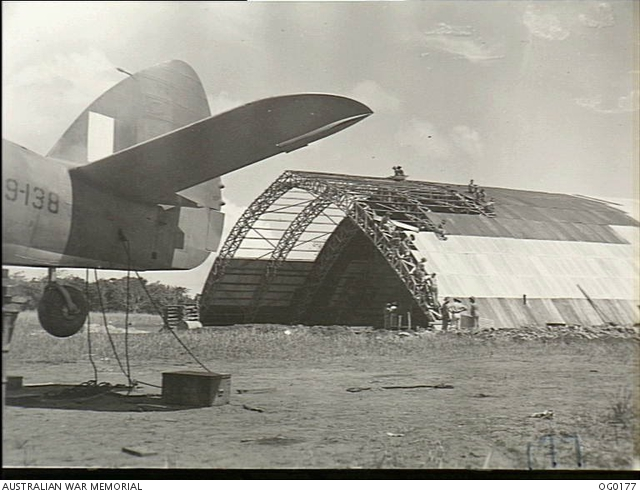
View past the tail of a Beaufighter of a hangar under construction 1943

=== Post war ===
Vivigani Airstrip was a general use airstrip until roughly 2006. This airstrip is now closed; the only two air operations that regularly used it (MAF & JAARS) now refuse to attempt to land there. The airstrip is still very visible, but is becoming increasingly overgrown by native kunai grass.

== See also ==
- Naval Base Bolubolu
