= No. 79 Squadron RAAF =

Royal Australian Air Force flight training unit

- No. 79 Squadron's crest; the phoenix symbolises the multiple occasions the squadron has been disbanded and re-formed.
- Active: 1943–1945; 1962–1968; 1986–1988; 1998–current
- Country: Australia
- Branch: Royal Australian Air Force
- Part of: No. 78 Wing
- Current base: RAAF Base Pearce
- Motto: "Born for Action"
- Engagements: World War II; New Britain Campaign; Admiralty Islands campaign

Commanders
- Notable commanders: Alan Rawlinson (1943)

Aircraft flown
- Fighter: Spitfire (1943–1945); CAC Sabre (1962–1968); Mirage III (1986–1988)
- Trainer: Aermacchi MB-326 (1998–2001); Hawk 127 (2000–current)
- Transport: DHC-4 Caribou (1986–1988)

No. 79 Squadron is a Royal Australian Air Force (RAAF) flight training unit that has been formed on four occasions since 1943. The squadron was established in May 1943 as a fighter unit equipped with Supermarine Spitfires, and subsequently saw combat in the South West Pacific theatre of World War II. Between June 1943 and the end of the war in August 1945 it flew air defence patrols to protect Allied bases and ships, escorted Australian and United States aircraft, and attacked Japanese positions. The squadron was disbanded in November 1945, but was re-formed between 1962 and 1968 to operate CAC Sabres from Ubon Air Base in Thailand. In this role it contributed to the defence of Thailand against a feared attack from its neighbouring states and exercised with United States Air Force units. No. 79 Squadron was active again at RAAF Base Butterworth in Malaysia between 1986 and 1988 where it operated Mirage III fighters and a single DHC-4 Caribou transport during the period in which the RAAF's fighter squadrons were transitioning to new aircraft.

The squadron was re-formed in its present incarnation during 1998 and is currently stationed at RAAF Base Pearce, where it has operated Hawk 127 (upgraded to Hawk 128 standard) jet training aircraft since 2000. The unit's main role is to provide introductory jet aircraft training to RAAF pilots as well as refresher training on the Hawk for experienced pilots. No. 79 Squadron also supports Australian Army and Royal Australian Navy training exercises in Western Australia and the Northern Territory.

== History ==
=== World War II ===
No. 79 Squadron was formed at RAAF Station Laverton in Victoria on 26 April 1943 under the command of flying ace Squadron Leader Alan Rawlinson. The squadron's intended role was to use Spitfire Vc fighters to provide 'high cover' escort for the RAAF's P-40 Kittyhawk-equipped units which were engaging Japanese forces in the New Guinea Campaign. This requirement was considered urgent, and the Chief of the Air Staff, Air Vice Marshal George Jones, directed that No. 79 Squadron receive priority for the RAAF's limited stock of Spitfires. The squadron moved to Wooloomanata Aerodrome several days after it was formed, and received its first Spitfires on 3 May. While at Wooloomanata No. 79 Squadron undertook training exercises to prepare for combat. The allocation of 24 Spitfires to the squadron led to No. 1 Wing RAAF, which was stationed near Darwin and responsible for protecting the town against air attack, to suffer a shortage of these aircraft during June and July.

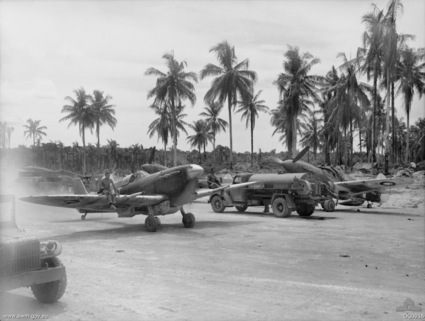
A No. 79 Squadron Spitfire Mk. VC and ground crew at Momote Airfield in April 1944

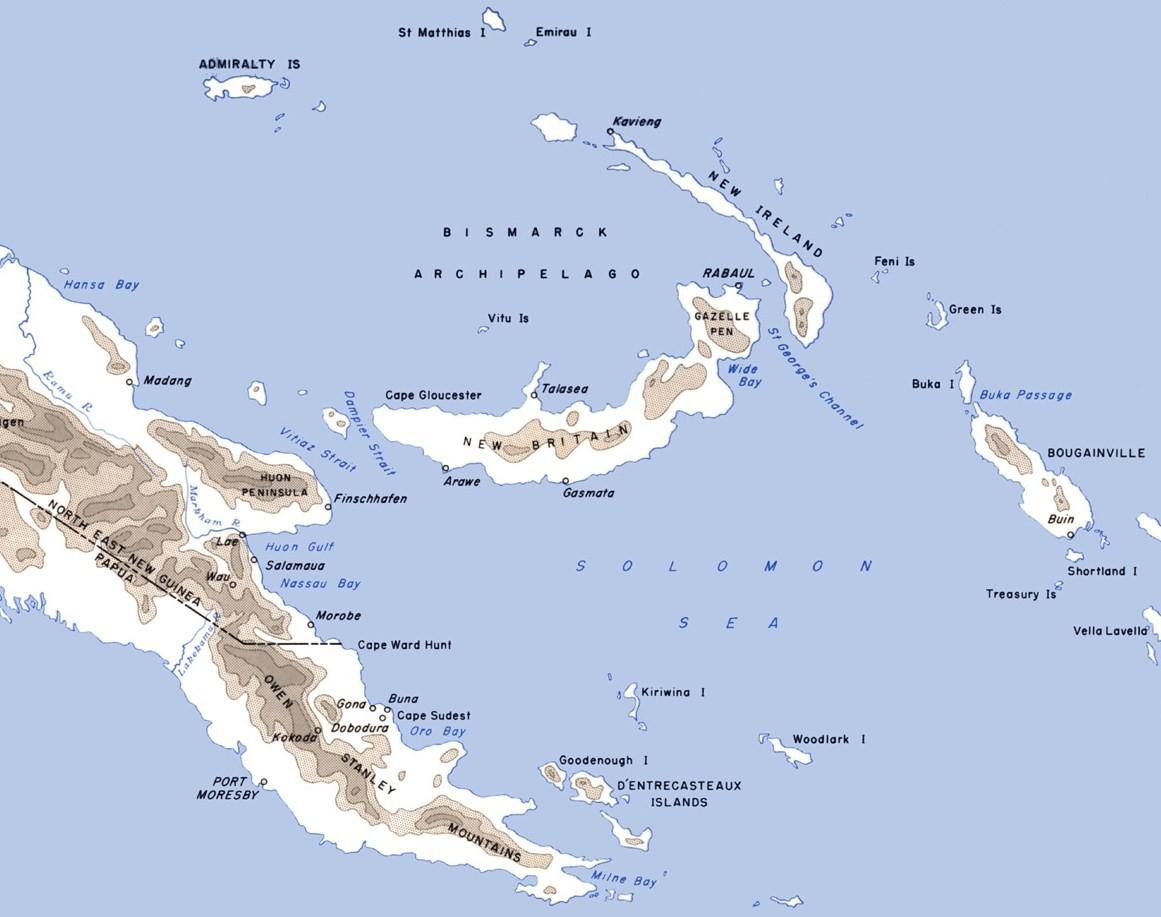
Map of Eastern New Guinea, New Britain and nearby islands

No. 79 Squadron began moving to Goodenough Island in the war zone off the north coast of Papua in mid-May 1943. Its advance party departed Wooloomanata on 17 May, followed by the pilots on 4 June. The main body of ground crew sailed from Sydney on 7 June. The squadron suffered its first fatality on 13 June, when Flight Lieutenant Virgil Brennan—an experienced fighter pilot who had shot down 10 Axis aircraft over Malta—died from wounds incurred when his Spitfire collided with another while they were landing at Cairns. During the unit's transit to Goodenough Island, No. 79 Squadron Spitfires were scrambled from Gurney Airfield at Milne Bay on several occasions between 19 and 25 June to intercept Japanese reconnaissance aircraft, but did not damage these intruders.

The squadron completed its movement to Goodenough Island on 26 June and began flying air defence sorties from there as part of No. 73 Wing. It did not intercept any Japanese aircraft while operating from this base. The squadron moved to Kiriwina Airfield on Kiriwina between 9 and 18 August, from where it operated alongside the P-40 Kittyhawk-equipped No. 76 Squadron. This was the closest Allied airfield to the major Japanese base at Rabaul and was expected to be regularly attacked. No Japanese raids were made on the airfield during the first weeks of the squadron's deployment there, and its pilots were disappointed to not see combat while conducting patrols in support of United States Army Air Forces (USAAF) raids on Rabaul. The Imperial Japanese Army Air Force (IJAAF) began a series of attacks on Goodenough Island and Kiriwina in early October, and the squadron claimed its first victory in 31 October when one of its Spitfires shot down a Kawasaki Ki-61 fighter 2 miles (3.2 km) north of Kiriwina (this type of aircraft was labelled the "Tony" by the Allies).

After a period of training, No. 79 Squadron flew its first sweep over Japanese-held territory on 27 November when eight Spitfires were dispatched to Gasmata on New Britain. The next day one of its Spitfires shot down a Mitsubishi Ki-46 "Dinah" reconnaissance aircraft south of Kitava. As few Japanese attacks were made against Kiriwina, No. 79 Squadron's pilots became restive. The offensive patrols over New Britain improved their morale, however. Another Ki-61 was intercepted and shot down by a Spitfire on 21 December, and a Mitsubishi A6M "Zero" fighter was destroyed on the ground at Gasmata seven days later. A Spitfire was lost during a patrol over New Britain on 31 December. During January and February 1944 the squadron conducted offensive sweeps over New Britain, strafed Japanese positions and escorted Allied bombers. On 17 January, eight No. 79 Squadron Spitfires took part in an attack against a Japanese camp near Lindenhafen which involved 73 Australian aircraft; this was the largest RAAF operation of the war up to that time. Two Spitfires were lost during the operations in January and February.

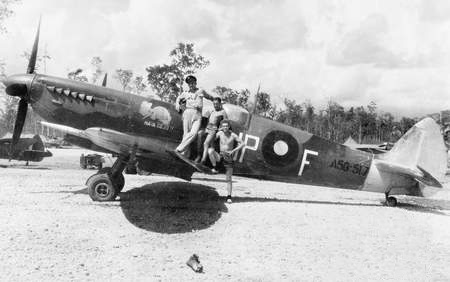
A No. 79 Squadron pilot (wearing uniform) and two members of the squadron's ground crew posing with a Spitfire Mk. VIII at Morotai during September 1945

In early 1944 No. 73 Wing was selected to support the US Army's Admiralty Islands campaign. The 1st Cavalry Division began to land on the islands on 29 February, and the wing moved to Momote Airstrip on Los Negros Island in March 1944. No. 79 Squadron became operational there with 24 aircraft on the 29th of the month. From Momote, the squadron flew ground attack sorties in support of US troops until Japanese resistance ceased. No Japanese aircraft were encountered throughout this operation. By the end of April, No. 79 Squadron's main role was to escort Allied shipping, though flying was hampered by a shortage of spare parts. The squadron's commanding officer, Squadron Leader M.S. Bott, was killed in an accident on 16 April. Shipping escort patrols continued in May, but difficulties maintaining the Spitfires reduced the squadron to just two operational aircraft with another 12 awaiting repair. Due to a shortage of aircraft the squadron's flying activities were limited to training sorties between August and October, and aircraft availability continued to be a problem until late November. On 9 November, two Spitfires unsuccessfully attempted to intercept three Japanese A6M fighters which had raided Hyane Harbour; while the Japanese force had been tracked by Allied radar for 25 minutes prior to the attack, the Spitfires were scrambled only after the raiders had left the area. No. 79 Squadron subsequently maintained a three-aircraft patrol over Los Negros during daylight hours until 22 November. Two days later the squadron was released from operations ahead of moving to Darwin to be re-equipped with more modern Mark VIII Spitfires.

No. 79 Squadron arrived at Sattler Airfield south of Darwin on 12 January 1945 and received its new aircraft shortly afterwards. It began to move to Morotai in the Netherlands East Indies (NEI) on 6 February and became operational there as part of No. 80 Wing at the end of March. The squadron conducted ground attack sorties against Japanese positions on nearby islands until the end of the war and also became responsible for Morotai's air defence from 28 May. Although no Japanese aircraft were encountered in this area, several Spitfires were shot down by anti-aircraft fire during ground attack sorties. Operations were hindered at times by personnel shortages, and many of the airmen who were posted to the unit were judged by the squadron's commander to have been inadequately trained. On 30 July No. 80 Wing was disbanded and the squadron became the first flying unit assigned to the newly formed No. 11 Group. This group was responsible for garrison duties in much of Borneo and the eastern NEI. No. 79 Squadron dropped leaflets on Japanese positions after Japan agreed to surrender on 15 August and returned to Australia in October 1945. It was disbanded at Oakey Airfield on 12 November that year. The unit suffered 13 fatal casualties during the war. In late 2010 the squadron was awarded battle honours for its World War II service in the Pacific, New Britain and Morotai.

=== Ubon ===
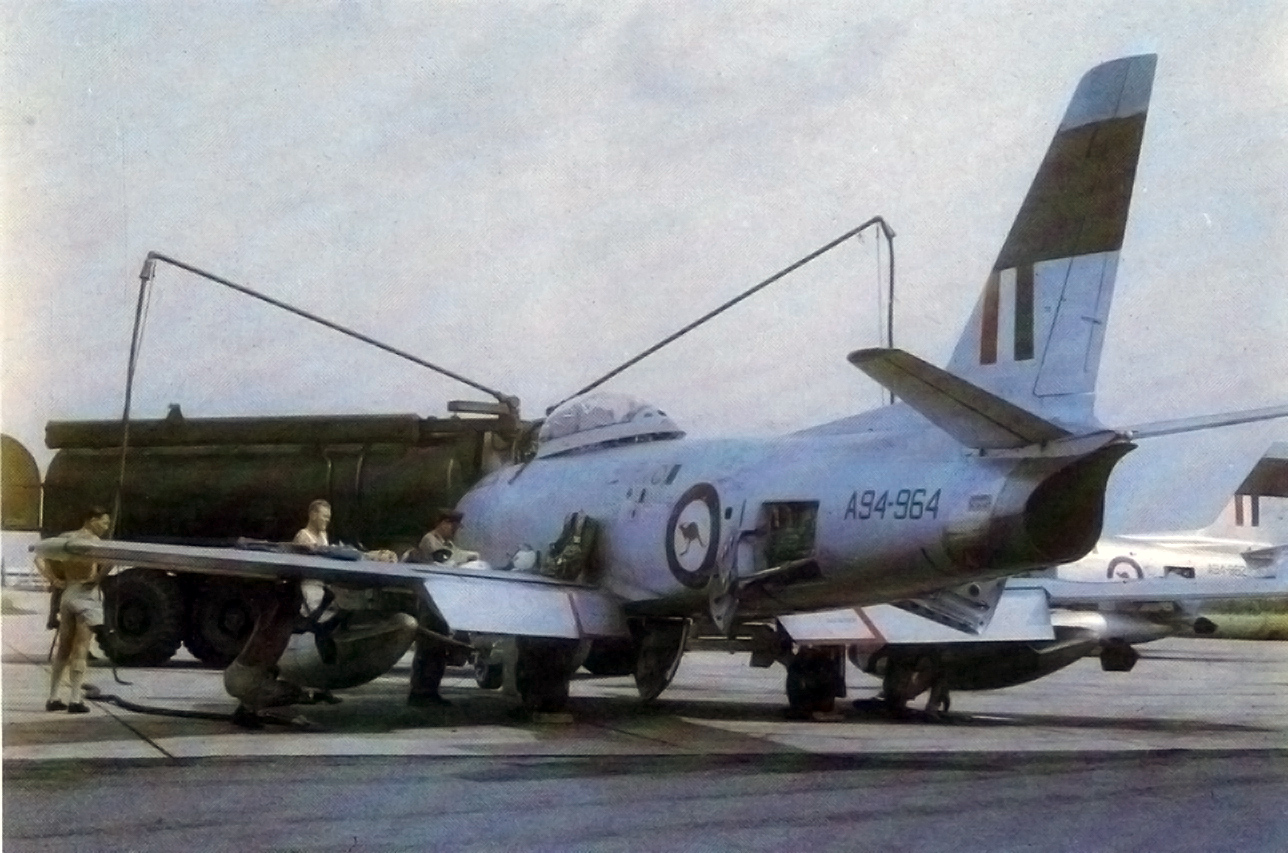
No. 79 Squadron Sabres at Ubon

In May 1962 the Australian Government decided to deploy a squadron of CAC Sabre fighters to Thailand to bolster that country's defences. This action was undertaken as part of Australia's Southeast Asia Treaty Organization (SEATO) commitment to defend Thailand against attack from its Communist neighbours, which was thought likely to occur. The United States, the United Kingdom and New Zealand also deployed forces to Thailand in response to this perceived threat, though Malaysia and several other SEATO members chose not to be involved. On 28 May, Minister for Defence Athol Townley announced that Australia's contribution would be an RAAF squadron equipped with Sabre fighters. The eight aircraft, along with their pilots and ground crew, were drawn from No. 77 Squadron, which formed part of Australia's Commonwealth Strategic Reserve forces at RAAF Base Butterworth in Malaysia. To preserve Malaysia's neutrality, the Sabres were flown to Thailand via Singapore. This force was designated No. 79 Squadron while at Tengah Air Base in Singapore on 29 May.^{(I)}

The squadron arrived at Ubon Air Base in the Ubon Ratchathani Province of eastern Thailand on 1 June 1962 and flew its first operational patrol four days later. Facilities at Ubon were initially spartan, and the pilots and ground crew lived in tents. Construction of permanent accommodation began under the supervision of No. 5 Airfield Construction Squadron in September 1962, and facilities were later further improved. Despite Malaysia's policy of neutrality in regards the conflict in Southeast Asia, No. 79 Squadron operated as a detachment of the RAAF force (No. 78 Wing) based at Butterworth throughout its time in Thailand. Aircraft and personnel were regularly transferred between Butterworth and Ubon, and most pilots' nominally six-month-long tours of duty in Thailand were broken into several shorter periods during which they and their aircraft were illegally rotated between the two bases. In March 1963 the Defence Committee, the highest decision-making body of the Department of Defence, recommended to Cabinet that No. 79 Squadron be withdrawn from Thailand on the grounds that the British and New Zealand contingents had left the country. The Cabinet's Foreign Affairs and Defence Committee decided against this on 28 March as it was believed that maintaining the squadron at Ubon helped maintain good relationships with Thailand and the United States. The Thai Government was discreetly asked if it would prefer a different form of assistance.

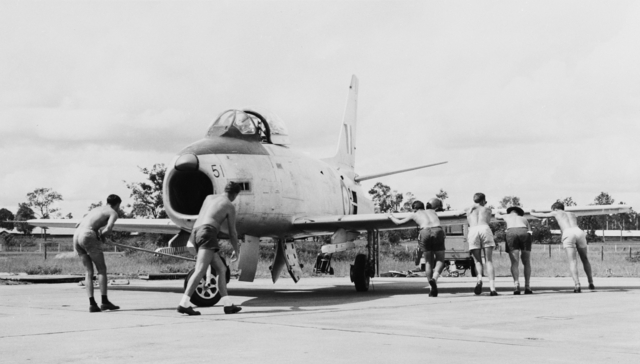
RAAF ground crew pushing a Sabre before it took off from Ubon in 1965

Throughout its period at Ubon, No. 79 Squadron formed part of an international force tasked with defending Thailand's air space against intruders. At the start of the deployment, tensions in Thailand were such that the squadron's personnel believed that they were at war. While the situation became more stable from late July 1962, No. 79 Squadron maintained armed aircraft on alert at all times and scrambled Sabres when unidentified aircraft were detected. No air attacks were conducted against Thailand, however, and the unidentified aircraft that were intercepted almost always proved to be from the Central Intelligence Agency–controlled Air America. In January 1965 two Sabres accidentally overflew North Vietnam after becoming lost during a training sortie but returned safely to Ubon.

From early April 1965, Ubon became an important base for United States Air Force (USAF) attacks on North Vietnam during the Vietnam War, and No. 79 Squadron became part of an integrated air defence system controlled by the USAF on 25 June. This changed the status of the squadron's presence in Thailand, and RAAF Headquarters assessed that the North Vietnamese would be justified in regarding it as forming part of the air campaign against their country. Due to the threat of counter-attacks on Ubon, the base's ground defences were upgraded during 1966; this included the construction of defensive positions for No. 79 Squadron's aircraft and personnel as well as the deployment of a detachment of RAAF airfield defence guards. While the squadron did not play an active role in the war, it supported the US effort by providing air defence for Ubon and taking part in exercises with USAF aircraft in which the Sabres adopted tactics used by North Vietnamese MiG-17 fighters. In December 1965 the commander of the United States Pacific Air Forces, General Hunter Harris Jr., wrote to the chief of the RAAF, Air Marshal Alister Murdoch, to suggest that No. 79 Squadron join the USAF operations against the Ho Chi Minh trail in southern Laos which were being covertly conducted by Ubon-based aircraft. The Thai Government indicated that it would allow the squadron to be used for this purpose as long as the Australian operations were conducted without a formal agreement or any public announcement. On 2 March 1966 the Australian Cabinet decided to reinforce the Army and RAAF force in South Vietnam, but rejected the option of expanding the scope of RAAF operations in Thailand. This decision was made on the grounds that the expanded force in South Vietnam and existing deployments to Thailand, Malaysia and Singapore represented the maximum forces Australia could commit to the region.

By mid-1968, No. 79 Squadron no longer had a clear role at Ubon. The USAF had sufficient fighters based in Thailand to defend the country and was reluctant to use the Australian fighters—which were now regarded as obsolete—to intercept potentially hostile aircraft, as the squadron's rules of engagement did not allow it to pursue contacts that left Thai airspace. As a result, the Australian military's chiefs of staff determined that the RAAF presence in Thailand had outlived its political and military usefulness and decided to withdraw the squadron without replacement. No. 79 Squadron was taken off alert status on 26 July and disbanded at the end of the month. On 31 March 2011 it received a battle honour for its deployment to Ubon between May 1962 and August 1968.^{(II)}

=== Butterworth ===
On 31 March 1986, No. 79 Squadron was re-formed at RAAF Base Butterworth as a temporary measure to cover part of the period while the RAAF's three fighter squadrons were transitioning from Mirage IIIs to F/A-18 Hornets. The squadron inherited all of No. 3 Squadron's twelve Mirage III fighters and most of its personnel; the remainder of No. 3 Squadron returned to Australia to be re-equipped with Hornets. As well as the Mirage IIIs, the squadron operated a single DHC-4 Caribou transport that was also based at Butterworth.

In its new incarnation, No. 79 Squadron continued the air defence and training duties for which No. 3 Squadron had been responsible at Butterworth. It participated in routine training exercises in Southeast Asia, which included making regular deployments to Paya Lebar Air Base in Singapore to train with the Republic of Singapore Air Force. In May 1987 the squadron deployed to Clarke Air Force Base in the Philippines to participate in the annual Cope Thunder exercise with USAF units. It also exercised with No. 77 Squadron's new F/A-18 Hornets in April 1988 when that unit visited Butterworth. The Caribou transport was used to support Australian Army units in Malaysia and also flew training sorties to neighbouring countries.

By early 1988 both No. 3 and No. 77 Squadrons had successfully converted to the F/A-18, and No. 79 Squadron was no longer required. Preparations to return the unit's Mirages to Australia took place during the first months of 1988, and on 3 May they departed Butterworth. As the RAAF's F/A-18 Hornet squadrons were to be based in Australia, this marked the end of the permanent deployment of RAAF fighters to Butterworth that had begun in mid-1958. No. 79 Squadron's aircraft commemorated the occasion by conducting a spectacular low-altitude flypast of the base, the first leg of which commenced at transonic speed. The aircraft were flown to Woomera in central Australia to be placed in storage via Paya Lebar, Bali, Darwin and RAAF Base Tindal. Most of No. 79 Squadron's ground crew returned to Australia in late May, and the squadron was formally disbanded at Butterworth on 30 June 1988.

=== Training unit ===
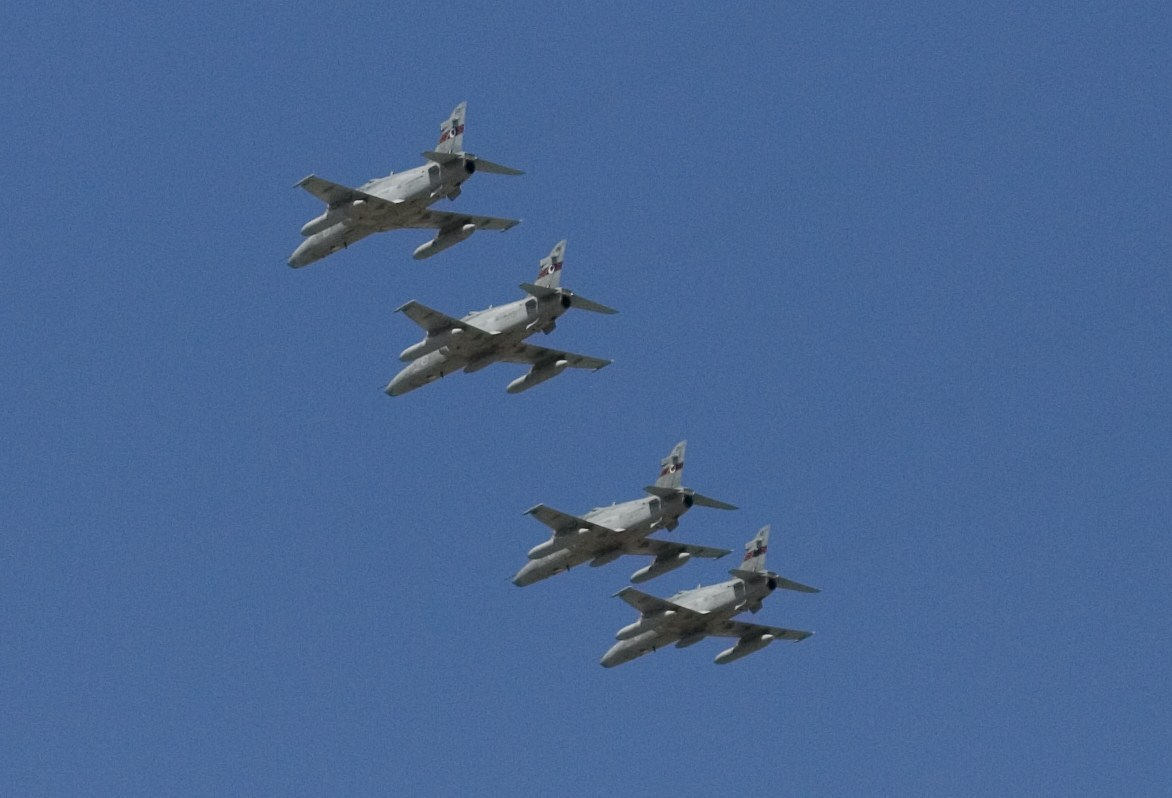
Four No. 79 Squadron Hawks in formation near RAAF Base Pearce in November 2008

No. 79 Squadron was re-formed a third time on 1 July 1998 as a training unit located at RAAF Base Pearce near Perth in Western Australia. The squadron was re-established by separating No. 25 Squadron's Permanent Air Force (full-time) component from its Air Force Reserve (part-time reservist) personnel and responsibilities. The squadron initially operated Aermacchi MB-326 aircraft before being re-equipped with Hawk 127 aircraft between 7 December 2000 and 4 March 2001. In 2000 No. 78 Wing was re-formed and assumed command of No. 76 and No. 79 Squadrons. The Hawks experienced serviceability problems during their first 18 months with the squadron, but these were eventually rectified. In October 2003 two No. 79 Squadron Hawks conducted a tour of Australia to belatedly commemorate the unit's 60th anniversary. As part of this tour the aircrew visited Alan Rawlinson at his home at Naracoorte, South Australia, and later conducted a flyover of the town in his honour. The squadron made its first overseas deployment in almost twenty years during April 2006 when six Hawks and 52 personnel were dispatched to RMAF Base Butterworth to take part in Exercise Bersama Shield. This was also the first time RAAF Hawks had operated overseas. As of May 2010, No. 79 Squadron was equipped with 15 of the RAAF's 33 Hawks. In 2011, the squadron was organised into a Training Flight, Operations Flight, and Maintenance Flight.

A program to modernise all of the RAAF's Hawks to a similar standard to the Royal Air Force's Hawk T.2 aircraft began in 2014. No. 79 Squadron's Maintenance Flight was disbanded in July 2016 when responsibility for support services for the Hawks was transferred to BAE Systems. The squadron began using the upgraded Hawks in July 2017. The unit's colours were consecrated at a ceremony held at RAAF Base Pearce on 20 November 2020. RAAF units typically receive colours after 25 years of service, and it took No. 79 Squadron until 2020 to achieve this as a result of having been disbanded and reformed on multiple occasions. In 2022, the Australian Government announced that the RAAF's fleet of Hawks was to be further upgraded and retained in service until 2031. The RAAF's Hawk fleet has been upgraded to Hawk 128 standard under the Lead-In Fighter Capability Assurance Program (LIFCAP).

== Current role ==
In its current role No. 79 Squadron's main responsibility is to provide introductory fast jet training to pilots who have recently graduated from No. 2 Flying Training School. During this training, new pilots who have been selected to fly jet aircraft are taught to operate Hawks and provided with initial instruction on jet aircraft combat tactics. In 2004, each of No. 79 Squadron's training courses lasted for twelve weeks. After completing their initial jet aircraft training, pilots transfer to No. 76 Squadron at RAAF Base Williamtown for advanced instruction before being posted to one of the RAAF's operational conversion units. No. 79 Squadron also provides introductory training on fast jets for RAAF air combat officers who have been selected to serve on board F/A-18F Super Hornets. The squadron trained RAAF personnel selected to serve as navigators on board F-111 strike aircraft until these aircraft were replaced with Super Hornets in 2010. No. 79 Squadron also provides refresher training on the Hawk aircraft for experienced fighter pilots.

In addition to its pilot training responsibilities, No. 79 Squadron's Operations Flight provides aircraft to support Navy and Army training exercises. These duties are undertaken by experienced pilots who did not successfully complete operational conversion training, and also by new pilots who have completed training with No. 76 Squadron and been posted back to No. 79 Squadron until a place becomes available in an operational conversion course. No. 76 Squadron has a similar Operations Flight. Most of No. 79 Squadron's exercises with the Navy take place off the coast of Western Australia, but aircraft are occasionally deployed to Darwin for this task.

== Notes ==
^(I) Coulthard-Clark (1995), p. 13 states that the detachment of Sabres was officially designated No. 79 Squadron on 24 June 1962.
^(II) No. 79 Squadron's battle honour for its service at Ubon was one of several new battle honours issued on 31 March 2011 to mark the 90th anniversary of the RAAF's formation.
