= Battle of Goodenough Island order of battle =

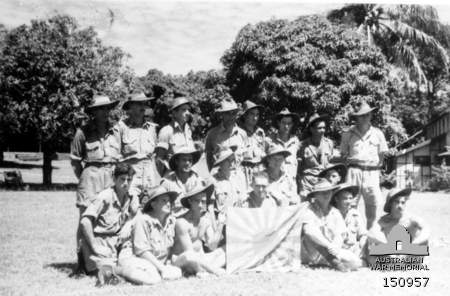
Australian soldiers with a Japanese flag captured during the fighting at Goodenough Island

The Battle of Goodenough Island (22 – 27 October 1942) took place in the South West Pacific Area (SWPA) during World War II.

== Allied Forces ==
=== Ground Forces ===
- 2/12th Battalion
- 2/5th Field Ambulance
- No. 2 Anti-aircraft Platoon
- Detachment J, Section Signals, 7th Division
- Transport Platoon
- Detachment Mortars
- Detachment Australian Army Service Corps
- Captain Burkholder (United States Army Service of Supply, New Guinea)
- Lieutenant Humphrey (8th Fighter Group, United States Army Air Forces)

=== Naval Forces ===
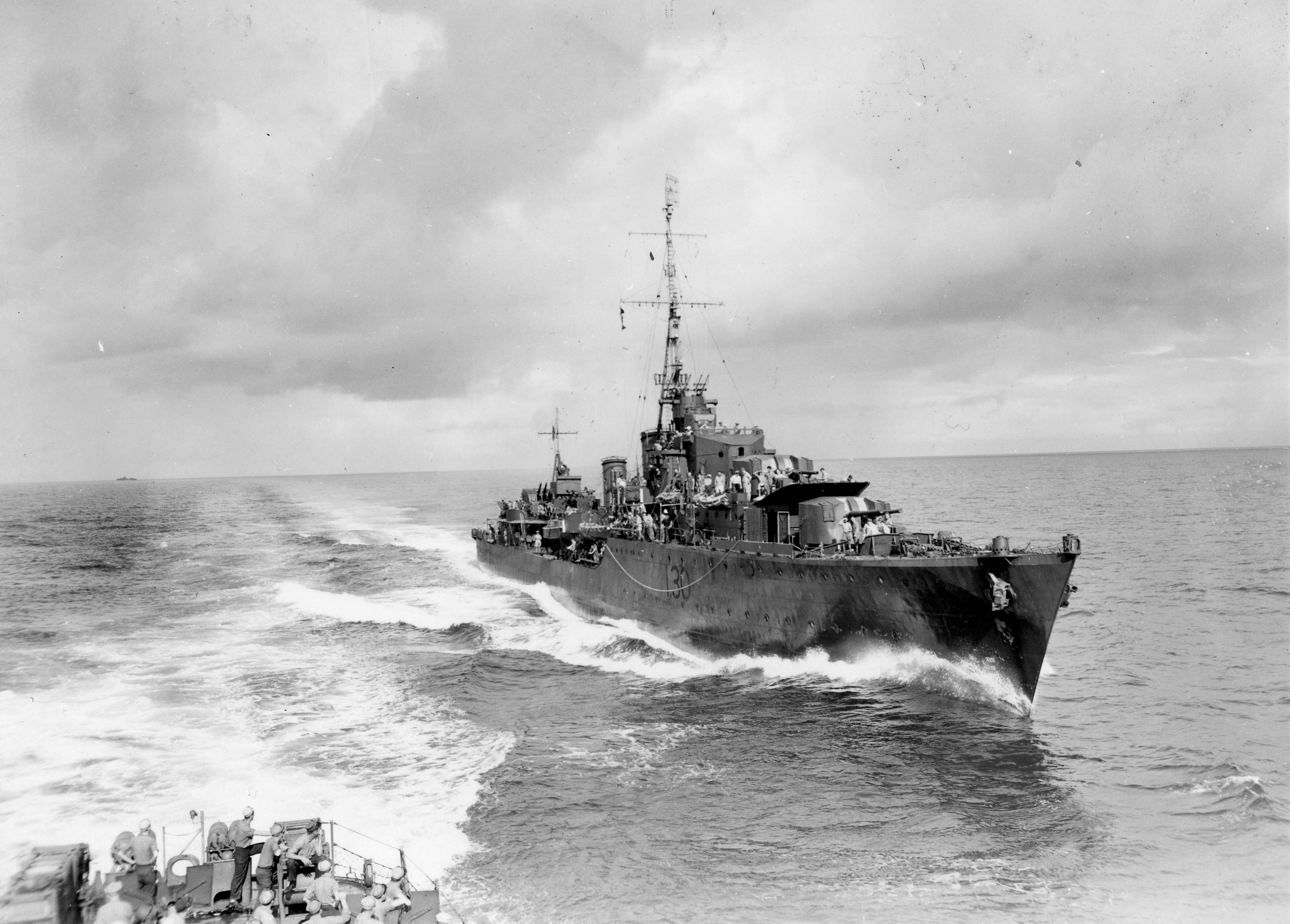
HMAS Arunta in July 1943

- Task Force 44 (Covering Force)
  - Cruiser
    - USS Phoenix (flagship)
  - Destroyers
    - USS Bagley
    - USS Selfridge
    - USS Mugford
- Transport Force
  - HMAS Arunta
  - HMAS Stuart
  - Ketch Matona
  - Ketch McLaren King
  - Ketch Tierno
  - 3 captured Japanese barges
  - 2 power driven whale boats

== Japanese Forces ==
- 5th Sasebo Special Naval Landing Force
- detachment 14th Pioneer Unit
- detachment 15th Pioneer Unit
