= Hōfu Air Field =

Hōfu Air Field 防府飛行場
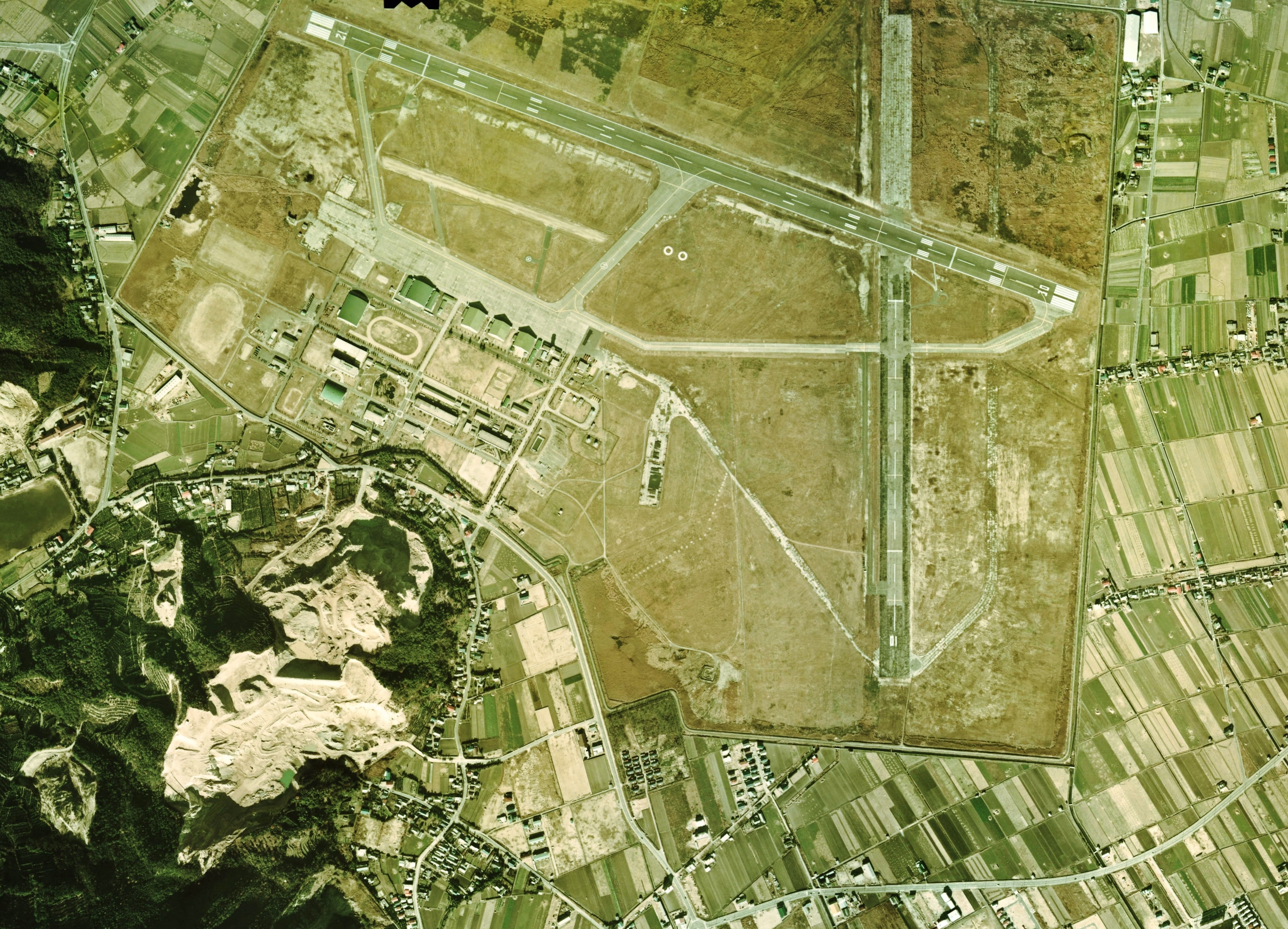
- IATA: none; ICAO: RJOF

Summary
- Airport type: Military
- Operator: Japan Air Self-Defense Force
- Location: Hōfu, Japan
- Elevation AMSL: 7 ft (2.1 m)
- Coordinates: 34°02′04″N 131°32′47″E

Map
- Location in Japan

Runways
Direction	Length		Surface
Direction	m	ft	Surface
01/19	1,180	3,871	Asphalt
12/30	1,480	4,856	Asphalt
- Source: Japanese AIP at AIS Japan

Hōfu Air Field (防府飛行場, Hōfu Hikōjō) (ICAO: RJOF) is a military aerodrome of the Japan Air Self-Defense Force Hōfu-kita Airbase (防府北基地, Hōfu-kita Kitchi). It is located 1.1 NM (2.0 km; 1.3 mi) southwest of Hōfu in the Yamaguchi Prefecture, Japan.

== History ==
Hōfu Airfield's origins appear to begin as a World War II airfield, as its runway pattern is indicative of wartime fields built in that era. It was the main Royal Australian Air Force base during the early part of the occupation of Japan and was repaired by No. 5 Airfield Construction Squadron RAAF. From September 1947 the United States Air Force's 347th Fighter Wing (All Weather) based F-61 Black Widow night fighters at the airfield as part of the air defense of Japan, but moved shortly afterwards to Ashiya Airfield. The 347th later stationed new F-82 Twin Mustangs at the airfield in October 1948, moving them to Ashiya in May 1949. It was apparently placed in reserve status afterwards, the 6134th Air Base Squadron being a housekeeping unit until 31 August 1951.

== Tenant squadrons ==
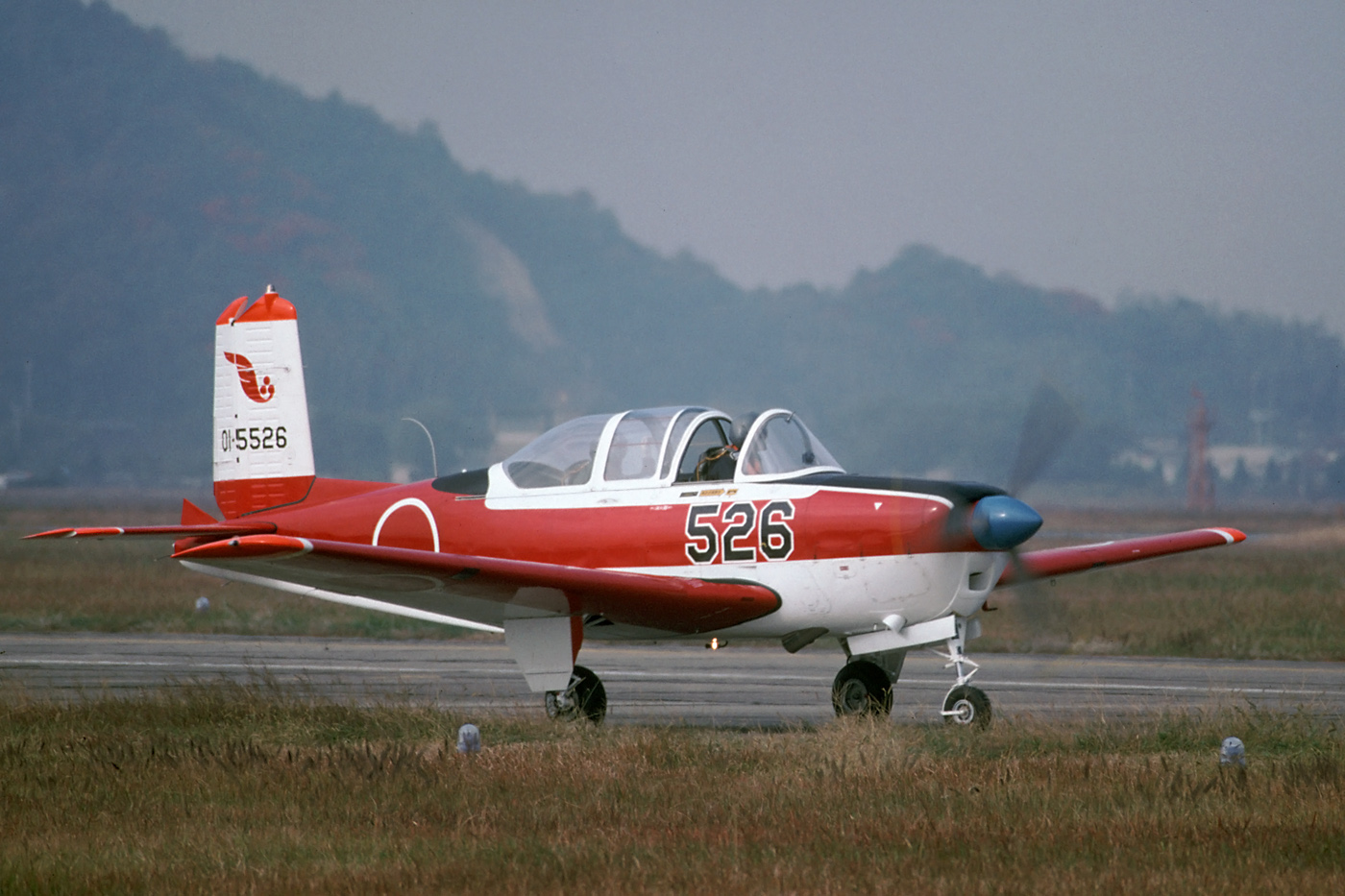
Fuji T-3 (1994)

Hōfu Air Field provides pilot flight training for the Japan Air Self Defense Force. It reports to JASDF Air Training Command, headquartered at Hamamatsu Air Base.

- 12th Flight Training Wing
  - 1st Flight Training Squadron (Fuji T-7)
  - 2nd Flight Training Squadron (Fuji T-7)
