= Taleba Bay =

Bay in Papua New Guinea

Coordinates: 9°27′S 150°14′E

Taleba Bay is a bay on the south western coast of Goodenough Island in the Milne Bay province of Papua New Guinea. The bay was the site of the landing of 120 troops of the Australian Army's 2/12th Infantry Battalion led by Major Keith Gatewood on 22 October 1942 as part of the Battle of Goodenough Island.
