= Ubon Royal Thai Air Force Base =

Ubon Royal Thai Air Force Base
- Part of Royal Thai Air Force (RTAF)

Site information
- Type: Air Force Base
- Owner: Royal Thai Air Force
- Operator: Royal Thai Air Force
- Controlled by: Royal Thai Air Force
- Condition: Military Air Force Base

Location
- Coordinates: 15°15′04.60″N 104°52′12.83″E

Site history
- Built: 1955
- In use: 1955–present
- Battles/wars: Vietnam War

Airfield information
- IATA: UBP; ICAO: VTUU

Summary
- Elevation AMSL: 406 ft (124 m)
- Coordinates: 15°15′04″N 104°52′12″E

Map
- Location of Ubon Royal Thai Air Force Base

Runways
Direction	Length		Surface
Direction	ft	m	Surface
05/23	9,848	3,002	asphalt

Ubon Royal Thai Air Force Base is a Royal Thai Air Force (RTAF) facility located near the city of Ubon Ratchathani, in Ubon Ratchathani Province. It is approximately 488 km (303 miles) northeast of Bangkok. The Laos border is about 60 kilometres (37 mi) directly east. The facility is also used as a civil airport.

Ubon RTAFB is the home of Wing 21 of the RTAF 2nd Air Division. The RTAF 211 Squadron Eagles fly the Northrop F-5E/F Tiger II fighter aircraft from Ubon.

== History ==
Ubon RTAFB was established in the 1950s. Political considerations with regards to communist forces engaging in a civil war inside Laos and fears of the civil war spreading into Thailand led the Thai government to allow the United States to covertly use five Thai bases beginning in 1961 for the air defense of Thailand and to fly reconnaissance flights over Laos.

Under Thailand's "gentleman's agreement" with the United States, RTAF base used by the USAF were commanded by Thai officers. Thai air police controlled access to the bases, along with USAF Security Police, who assisted them in base defense using sentry dogs, observation towers, and machine gun bunkers.

The USAF forces at Ubon were under the command of the United States Pacific Air Forces (PACAF). Ubon was the location of TACAN station Channel 51 and was referenced by that identifier in voice communications during air missions.

The Army Post Office (APO) code for Ubon was "APO San Francisco 96304".

== Royal Australian Air Force use ==
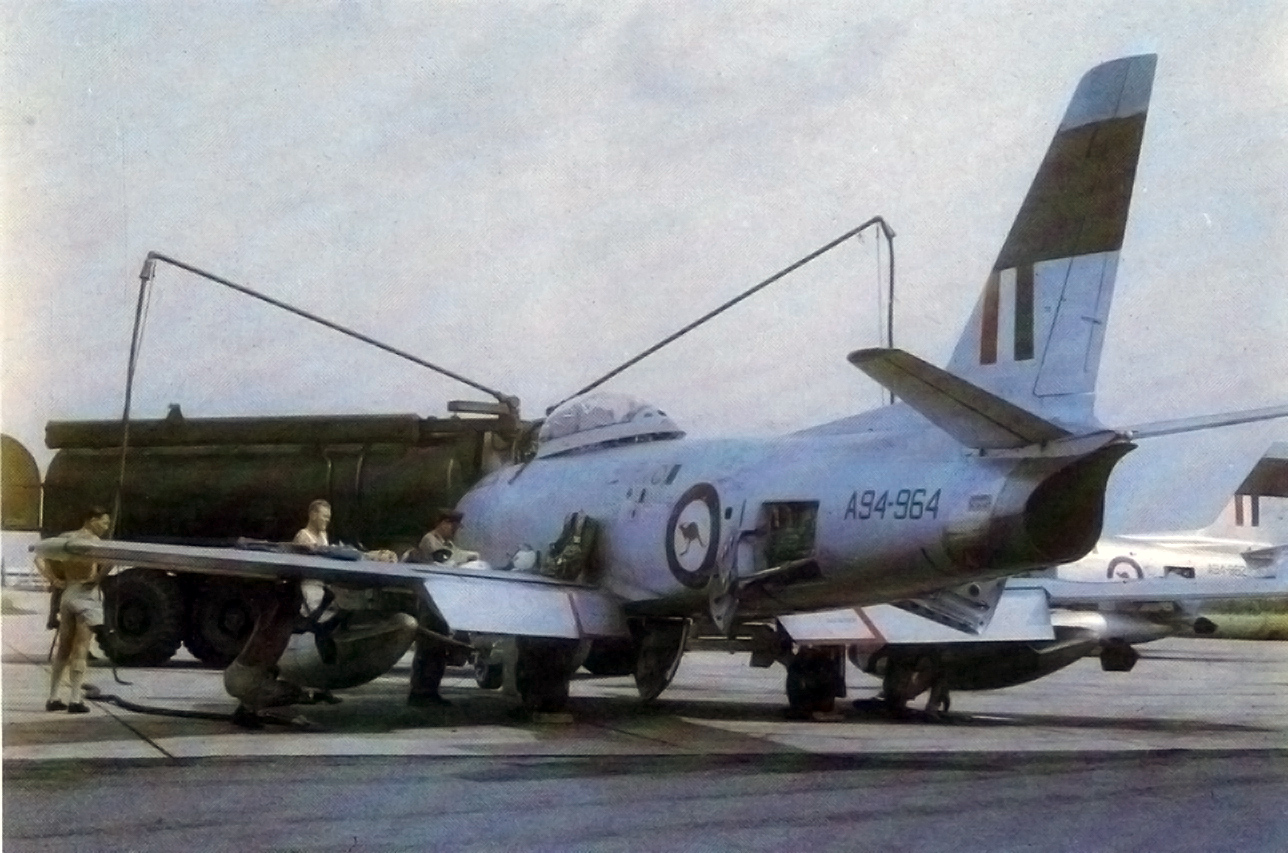
RAAF No. 79 Squadron CAC Sabres at Ubon, 1962

On 31 May 1962 the Royal Australian Air Force (RAAF) sent a detachment of eight CAC-27 Sabre fighters to Ubon RTAFB. This detachment was designated No. 79 Squadron. The Australian facilities were known as RAAF Ubon, and were designed and constructed by No. 5 Airfield Construction Squadron.

The mission of No. 79 Squadron was to assist the Thai and Laotian governments in actions against communist insurgents during the early years of the Vietnam War. With the deployment of USAF fighters to Ubon, the unit also performed joint exercises and provided air defense for the USAF attack aircraft and bombers based at Ubon. No. 79 Squadron did not, however, fly any operations over nearby Cambodia, South Vietnam, or Laos. The unit's strength during the entire period was about 150–200 men. Sir Edmund Hillary visited the base on 25 January 1967.

With its CAC Sabres now obsolete and restricted from operating outside Thai airspace, the squadron was disbanded at the end of July 1968.

== United States Air Force use ==
From 1965 to 1974, the base was a front-line facility of the USAF during the Vietnam War.

In June 1965, the 15th Tactical Fighter Wing deployed its 45th Tactical Fighter Squadron the first F-4C Phantom II unit in Southeast Asia to Ubon where they flew combat missions to North Vietnam. On 10 July 1965, pilots of the 45th TFS were credited with the first air victory of the Vietnam War, downing two North Vietnamese MiG-17s. The 45th TFS was on Temporary duty assignment (TDY) from its permanent home at MacDill AFB, Florida. The 45th flew 1,000+ hours with 24 aircraft over North Vietnam in August 1965. It was replaced by the 47th Tactical Fighter Squadron, also equipped with F-4Cs which arrived in July and returned to the US on 27 November 1965.

=== 8th Tactical Fighter Wing ===
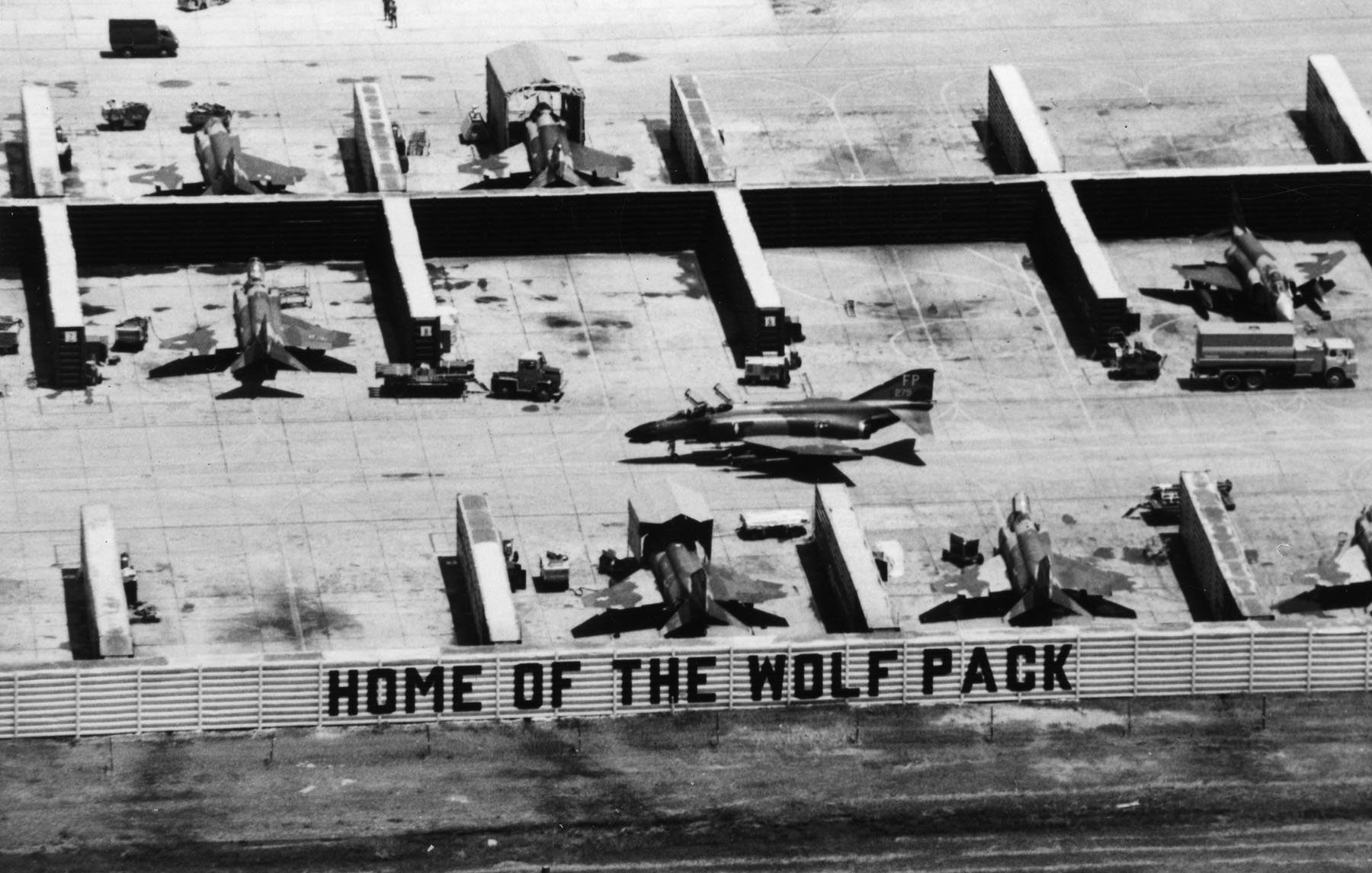
8th TFW F-4s in revetments at Ubon, 1967

The 8th Tactical Fighter Wing The Wolfpack arrived at Ubon on 8 December 1965 from George AFB, California as part of the US deployment of forces for Operation Rolling Thunder and became the host unit.

At Ubon, the 8th TFW's mission included bombardment, ground support, air defense, interdiction, and armed reconnaissance. The operational squadrons of the 8th TFW were:

- 433rd Tactical Fighter Squadron 8 December 1965 – 23 July 1974 (F-4C/D)
- 497th Tactical Fighter Squadron 8 December 1965 – 16 September 1974 (F-4C/D)
- 555th Tactical Fighter Squadron 25 February 1966 – 1 June 1968 (F-4C/D)
- 435th Tactical Fighter Squadron June 1967 – May 1968 (F-4D) deployed from 33rd TFW Eglin AFB Florida. Transferred to 432d TFW at Udorn RTAFB.
- 25th Tactical Fighter Squadron 25 May 1968 – 5 July 1974 (F-4D) also from the 33rd TFW replaced the 435th TFS
- No. 79 Squadron RAAF which provided top-cover for USAF aircraft whilst in Thai airspace with its CAC Sabres.

==== Operation Rolling Thunder ====
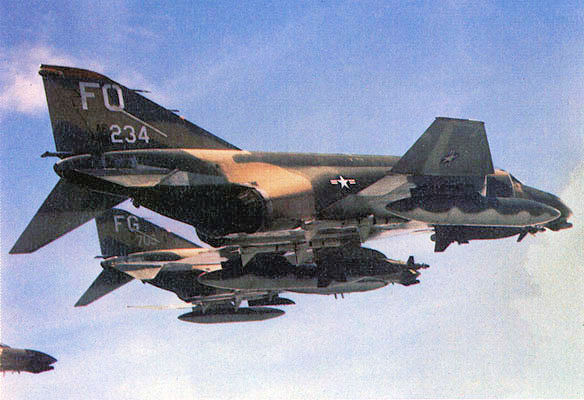
McDonnell F-4 #66-0234 of the 435th Tactical Fighter Squadron with laser-guided bombs

On 23 April 1966, the 8th TFW scored its first MiG kills of the Vietnam War, shooting down two MiG-17 fighters. By the end of June 1966, after only six months in the theater, the wing had flown more than 10,000 combat sorties, achieving a 99% sortie rate, for which they received commendations.

In late December 1966 the 8th TFW commander Colonel Robin Olds developed a plan to lure North Vietnamese MiGs into combat and destroy them. Operation Bolo took place on 2 January 1967 and resulted in the loss of 7 MiG-21s for no US losses.

On 10 March 1967 8th TFW F-4s took part in the first attacks on the Thái Nguyên ironworks, losing 2 F-4s to antiaircraft fire.

Beginning in late May 1967, new F-4D aircraft were delivered to Ubon, re-equipping the 555th TFS. The F-4D had improved radar-bombing capabilities and could deploy the AGM-62 Walleye television-guided bomb, but replaced the AIM-9 Sidewinder with the infra-red AIM-4 Falcon which proved to be inferior.

On 11 August 1967, the 8th, 355th and 388th Tactical Fighter Wings conducted a raid on the Paul Doumer railroad and highway bridge in Hanoi. Thirty-six strike aircraft dropped 94 tons of bombs and destroyed one span of the bridge and part of the highway.

On 8 February 1968 8th TFW F-4s attacked Phúc Yên Air Base to attempt to destroy Il-28 bombers based there, losing 2 F-4s to antiaircraft fire in the low-level attack. Further attacks took place on 10 and 14 February with no losses and negligible results on the ground. 2 MiG-17s were shot down during the 14 February attack in the last USAF aerial victories of Operation Rolling Thunder.

In May 1968, the wing was the first to use laser-guided bombs (LGBs) in combat and its Mig-Killers nickname was gradually replaced by Bridge-busters.

After North Vietnam invaded South Vietnam in March 1972 during the Easter Offensive, the 8th TFW was augmented by additional F-4 units.

==== Special operations missions ====
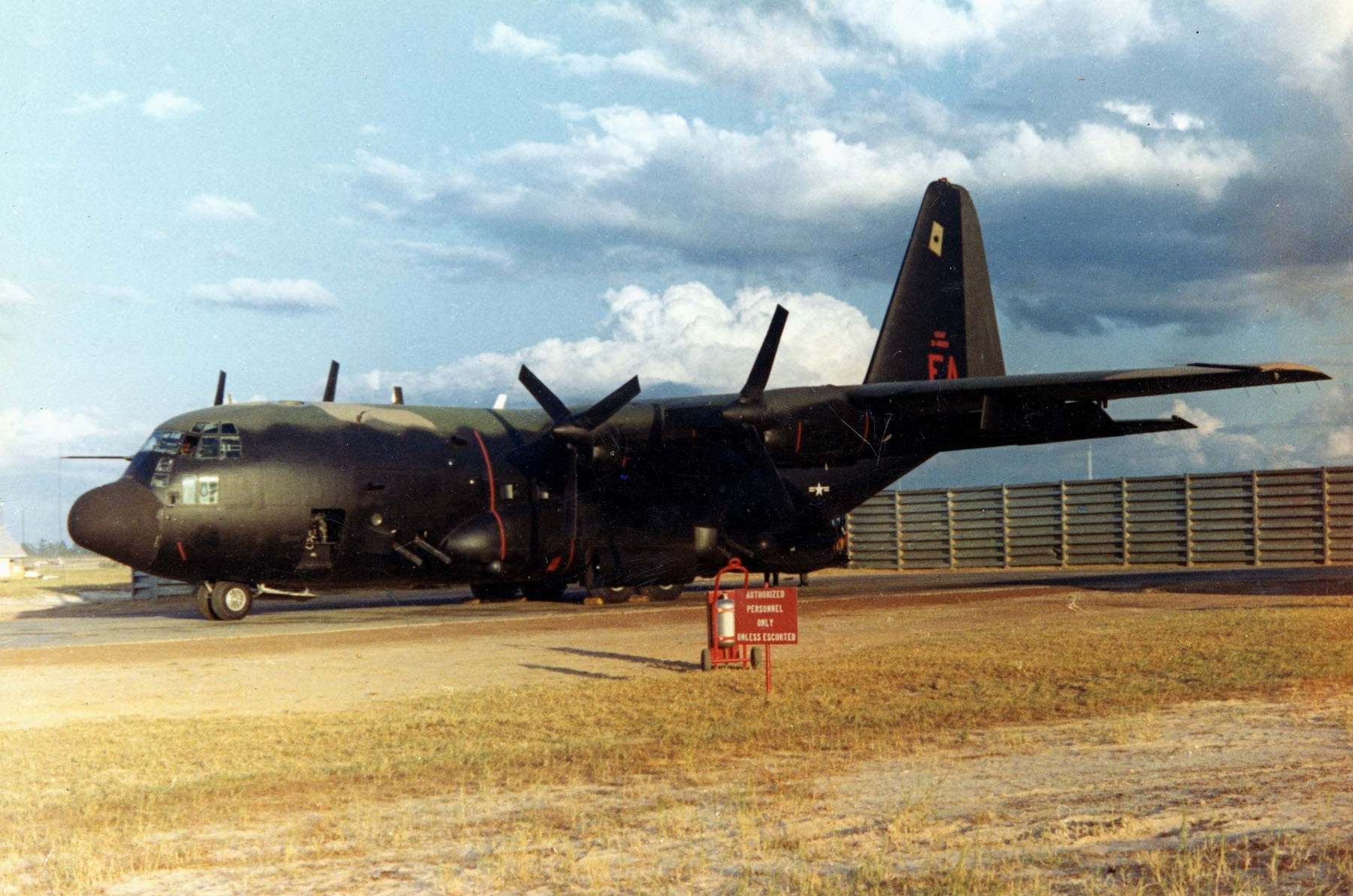
AC-130A of the 16th Special Operations Squadron, 1969

From March 1966 C-130A Project Blind Bat flareships of the 315th Air Division began operations over Laos from Ubon, increasing to 6 aircraft and 12 crews before their mission was superseded by newer systems in June 1970.

In April 1966 4 AC-47 Spooky gunships were deployed to Ubon for interdiction operations over Laos.

LORAN-equipped 8th TFW F-4Ds began the Operation Igloo White sensor-dropping mission over the Ho Chi Minh Trail in Laos from February 1968 taking over this role from the more vulnerable CH-3s and OP-2E Neptunes.

On 27 February 1968 the first prototype AC-130A Gunship II began operations from Ubon, destroying 9 trucks and 2 services areas in Laos on its first sortie. It remained at Ubon until 14 June when it was transferred to Tan Son Nhut Air Base.

With the arrival of the 16th Special Operations Squadron (SOS) in October 1968 flying 4 AC-130 Spectre gunships and with the end of Operation Rolling Thunder in November 1968, the 8th TFW's mission turned to interdiction of supplies down the Ho Chi Minh trail. By April 1969 the 16th SOS accounted for 44 percent of all trucks destroyed in Laos while flying only 3.7 percent of the sorties.

On 5 December 1969 the first AC-130 Surprise Package aircraft equipped with improved night-vision equipment and a Bofors 40 mm gun joined the 16th SOS at Ubon and began operation on 12 December. In May 1970 5 AC-130As left Ubon for conversion to Surprise Package configuration, returning in October and commencing operations in November.

The 16th SOS also tested 2 Project Black Spot AC/NC-123s beginning in December 1969. The aircraft had a very long nose fairing that housed a forward-looking radar and two internal aluminum weapons dispensers for CBU bomblets but no side-firing guns. This weapon system proved less effective than the AC-130, and operations with it were discontinued in June 1970.

On 22 July 1974, the 16th SOS was transferred to Korat RTAFB.

==== Tactical bombardment missions ====
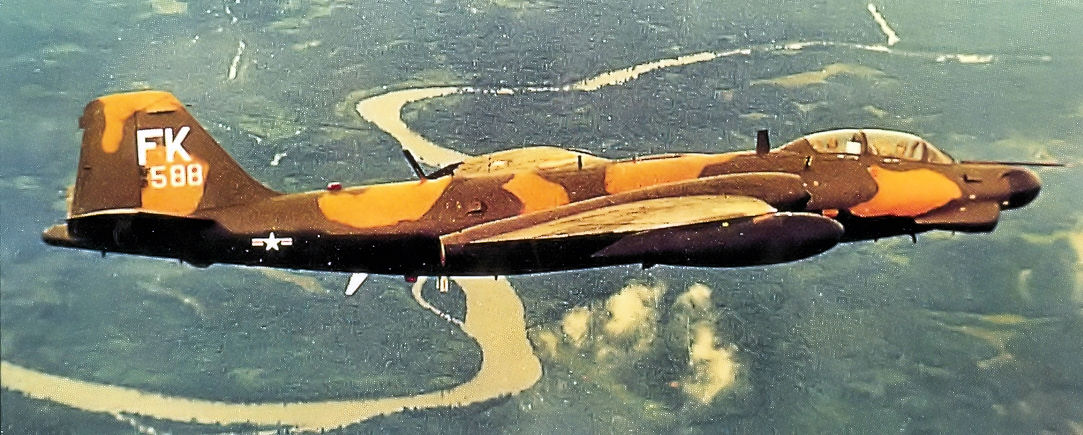
Martin B-57G 53-1588 13th Bomb Squadron Ubon RTAFB, 1970

The 13th Bombardment Squadron was deployed to Thailand and attached the 8th TFW from MacDill AFB, Florida on 1 October 1970 with a modified version of the Canberra medium bomber designated as the B-57G. Initially manufactured as B-57Bs in the early 1950s, the B-57G was fitted with a moving target radar as well as a low light level television system and a forward-looking infrared camera carried in a pod underneath the nose for use as night intruders over South Vietnam under a project known as Tropic Moon III.

Operations with the B-57G continued until April 1972, when they were moved to Clark Air Base in the Philippines to make room for the deployment of F-4E squadrons arriving from the United States.

The 13th BS remained but was no longer manned or equipped and was kept in a non-operational status with the 8th TFW until finally being inactivated on 24 December 1972.

==== Operation Linebacker/Linebacker II ====
In response to the Easter Offensive, from April 1972 F-4E squadrons temporarily deployed from the US to Ubon during the Constant Guard buildup as follows:

- 4th Tactical Fighter Wing, Seymour Johnson AFB, North Carolina
  - 334th Tactical Fighter Squadron 11 April 1972 – 8 July 1972; 25 September 1972 – 12 March 1973
  - 336th Tactical Fighter Squadron 12 April 1972 – 15 September 1972; 9 March 1973 – 7 September 1973
  - 335th Tactical Fighter Squadron 8 August 1972 – 31 December 1972
- 31st Tactical Fighter Wing, Homestead AFB, Florida
  - 308th Tactical Fighter Squadron 11 December 1972 – 11 January 1973
- 33rd Tactical Fighter Wing, Eglin AFB, Florida
  - 58th Tactical Fighter Squadron 8 June 1973 – 14 September 1973

The 334th TFS flew its first missions of Operation Freedom Train on 14 April, followed by the 366th the following day. On 13 May 1972 8th TFW F-4s equipped with laser-guided bombs succeeded in dropping a span of the Thanh Hóa Bridge which had been unscathed despite hundreds of previous attacks.

On 10 June 1972 8th TFW F-4s successfully destroyed the 3 generators of the Lang Chi hydropower plant 70 miles (110 km) northwest of Hanoi, without damaging the dam itself.

The squadrons also participated in Operation Linebacker II in December 1972, flying primarily as chaff bombers and strike escorts. In a 21 December attack an 8th TFW laser-guided bomb aimed at the Hanoi thermal power plant lost guidance and instead destroyed a Communist Party of Vietnam office building.

==== 8th TFW decorations ====
- Presidential Unit Citation: 16 December 1966 – 2 January 1967; 1 March 1967 – 31 March 1968; 1 January–1 April 1971.
- Air Force Outstanding Unit Award with Combat "V" Device: 16 December 1965 – 15 December 1966; 1 April–30 September 1968; 1 January–31 December 1970; 1 October 1971 – 31 March 1972; 1 April–22 October 1972; 18 December 1972 – 15 August 1973.
- Air Force Outstanding Unit Award: 12 May 1963 – 21 March 1964; 1 April 1977 – 31 March 1978; 1 June 1986 – 31 May 1988.
- Republic of Vietnam Gallantry Cross with Palm: 1 April 1966 – 28 January 1973.

=== Attacks ===
Ubon was attacked by sappers on 3 separate occasions during the Vietnam War period:

- 28 July 1969: at 1:30 a USAF Security Police dog team were wounded by 3 sappers leaving the base. At 02:00 5 explosions damaged 2 C-47s and a further 5 unexploded charges were found.
- 12 January 1970: at 22:30 on 11 January a Thai villager reported seeing 16 armed Vietnamese 3 km and the base was put on alert. At 02:01 a Security Policeman fired on a sapper inside the base perimeter and further sappers and Security Police joined the engagement with 5 sappers being killed. 35 satchel charges were found on the bodies.
- 4 June 1972: just after midnight Thai police fired on a sapper approaching the AC-130 parking area, killing him. Eight satchel charges were found on his body. The USAF Office of Special Investigations had earlier received a report that 12 Vietnamese expatriates had recently returned from North Vietnam where they had received sapper training.

On 2 October 1972 36 mortar rounds were fired at the base causing no losses.

=== Other tenant units ===
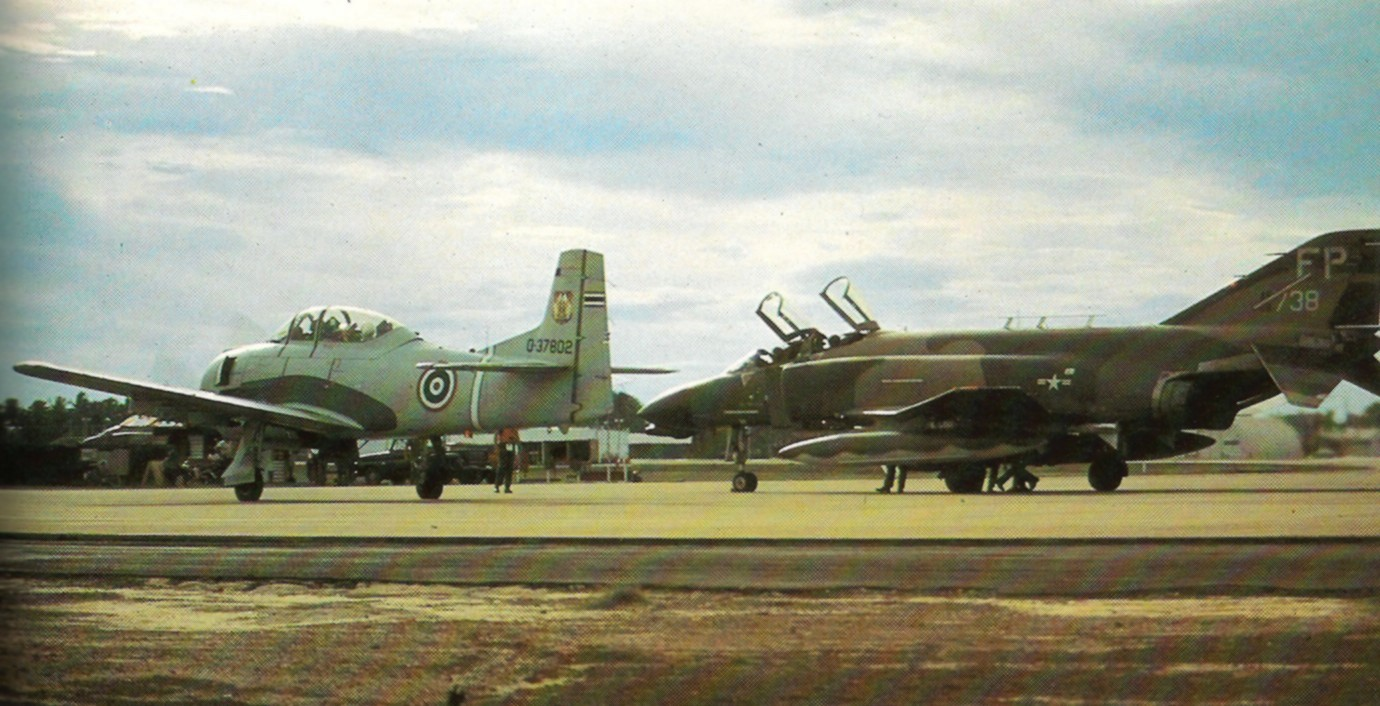
A 497th TFS F-4D with a RTAF T-28, September 1972

1982 Comm. Sq (AFCS) providing Air Traffic Control services for the Ubon tower, terminal radar approach area and enroute services for Bangkok Center. 1982 Comm, Sq. also maintained the AB Telcom and VOR/TACAN (VORTAC channel 51) equipment. In 1973 until 1974 the 1982nd Radio Maintenance section maintained the electronic sensor intrusion detection system on the perimeters of both the base and the bomb dump. It was also the only USAF base that ran opposite direction, single runway, air traffic; landing runway 23, departing runway 05.

Detachment 17, 10th Weather Squadron (MAC)

In mid-1965 Detachment 3, 38th Air Rescue Squadron equipped with 2 HH-43Bs deployed to Ubon to provide base search and rescue. On 1 July 1971 with the inactivation of the 38th Rescue Squadron, Detachment 3 became a detachment of the 3rd Aerospace Rescue and Recovery Group. Detachment 3 was inactivated in August 1974 with the winding down of base operations.

Two A-1 Skyraiders of the 1st Special Operations Squadron were usually based at Ubon to escort combat search and rescue missions over southern Laos and Cambodia. From December 1971 a detachment of 2 HH-53s from Nakhon Phanom Royal Thai Navy Base were based at Ubon for combat search and rescue missions.

From February to October 1967 EC-121 Warning Star aircraft of the College Eye Task Force were based at Ubon.

The 222nd Tactical Fighter Squadron, RTAF, performed their mission with T-28s, C-47s and UH-34 helicopters.

=== 1973–1975 USAF withdrawal ===
The Paris Peace Accords were signed on 27 January 1973 by the governments of North Vietnam, South Vietnam, and the United States with the intent to establish peace in Vietnam. The accords effectively ended United States military operations in North and South Vietnam. Laos and Cambodia, however, were not signatories to the Paris agreement and remained in states of war.

The US was helping the Royal Lao Government achieve whatever advantage possible before working out a settlement with the Pathet Lao and their allies. The USAF flew 386 combat sorties over Laos during January and 1,449 in February 1973. On 17 April, the USAF flew its last mission over Laos, attacking a handful of targets requested by the Laotian government.

In Cambodia the USAF carried out a massive bombing campaign to prevent the Khmer Rouge from taking over the country.

Congressional pressure in Washington grew against these bombings, and on 30 June 1973, the United States Congress passed Public law PL 93-50 and 93–52, which cut off all funds for combat in Cambodia and all of Indochina effective 15 August 1973. Air strikes by the USAF peaked just before the deadline, as the Khmer National Armed Forces engaged a force of about 10,000 Khmer Rouge encircling Phnom Penh.

At 11:00 15 August 1973, the Congressionally-mandated cutoff went into effect, bringing combat activities over the skies of Cambodia to an end. The last of the Constant Guard F–4 augmentation forces were released in September 1973.

In mid-1974 the wing began to lose personnel, aircraft, and units. The last scheduled F–4 training flight occurred on 16 July 1974 and on 16 September the wing and most of its components moved without personnel or equipment to Kunsan Air Base, South Korea, where the wing absorbed resources of the 3rd TFW that had moved without personnel or equipment to the Philippines.

On 16 September 1974 the USAF forces at Ubon were inactivated and the facility turned over to the Thai Government.

On 11/12 April Ubon served as a staging base for 8 HH-53s of the 40th Aerospace Rescue and Recovery Squadron as they took part in Operation Eagle Pull, the evacuation of US civilians from Phnom Penh.

== Accidents and incidents ==
- 3 January 1968: CAC Sabre A94-986 crashed into farms on approach outside the town due to engine failure. The pilot, Pilot Officer Mark McGrath was killed in the crash and a three-year-old Thai girl named Prataisre Sangdang later died from burns sustained in the accident. Four Thai homes were destroyed.
- 24 May 1969: USAF AC-130A damaged by AAA fire over Laos crashed on landing with one crewman killed
- 7 June 1969: USAF EC-47 #43-49547 crashed into the Mun River shortly after take-off following loss of power from at least one engine. All on board survived.
- 9 August 1983: RTAF VC-47B L2-30/07/641 crashed on take-off. All five people on board were killed, along with four on the ground.

== See also ==
- United States Air Force in Thailand
- United States Pacific Air Forces
- Seventh Air Force
- Thirteenth Air Force

== Bibliography ==
- Endicott, Judy G. (1999) Active Air Force wings as of 1 October 1995; USAF active flying, space, and missile squadrons as of 1 October 1995. Maxwell AFB, Alabama: Office of Air Force History. CD-ROM.
- Glasser, Jeffrey D. (1998). The Secret Vietnam War: The United States Air Force in Thailand, 1961–1975. McFarland & Company. ISBN 0-7864-0084-6.
- Martin, Patrick (1994). Tail Code: The Complete History of USAF Tactical Aircraft Tail Code Markings. Schiffer Military Aviation History. ISBN 0-88740-513-4.
- USAAS-USAAC-USAAF-USAF Aircraft Serial Numbers—1908 to present
