= 12th Flight Training Wing (JASDF) =

12th Flying Training Wing
- 第12飛行教育団
- Active: June 1, 1959
- Country: Japan
- Branch: Japan Air Self-Defense Force
- Part of: Air Training Command
- Garrison/HQ: Hōfu-kita Air Base

Aircraft flown
- Trainer: Fuji T-7

The 12th Flying Training Wing (第12飛行教育団, dai-12-hikō-kyōiku-dan) is a wing of the Japan Air Self-Defense Force. It is also sometimes known as the 12th Flight Training Wing. It comes under the authority of Air Training Command. It is based at Hōfu-kita Air Base in Yamaguchi Prefecture.

It has two squadrons, both equipped with Fuji T-7 aircraft:

- 1st Flight Training Squadron
- 2nd Flight Training Squadron
