= No. 65 Squadron RAAF =

- Active: 2015-current
- Branch: Royal Australian Air Force
- Role: Airfield repair and recovery
- Part of: No. 95 Wing RAAF
- Headquarters location: RAAF Base Amberley

No. 65 Squadron is a non-flying unit of the Royal Australian Air Force (RAAF). Raised in 2015, it comprises the RAAF's airfield engineering and explosive ordnance disposal capabilities.

== History ==
No. 65 Squadron was established on 1 July 2015 at RAAF Base Amberley by combining the Airfield Engineering Flight of No. 383 Squadron and No. 1 Security Forces Squadron's Explosive Ordnance Disposal (EOD) Flight. Upon formation, the squadron also comprised a small headquarters and a logistics element.

The squadron's role is to provide the RAAF's airfield repair and recovery capability. At the time the unit was raised, its headquarters was located at RAAF Base Amberley and flights were located at RAAF Base Townsville, RAAF Base Richmond and Defence Establishment Orchard Hills.

No. 65 Squadron's title was selected to reflect its composition. The '6' represents No. 6 Bomb Disposal Squadron, which was the final RAAF EOD unit raised during World War II. The '5' represents No. 5 Airfield Construction Squadron which was raised during World War II and disbanded in 1974.

As of 2017, No. 65 Squadron formed part of No. 95 Wing within the RAAF's Combat Support Group.
