= Gasmata =

Coordinates: 6°17′S 150°20′E

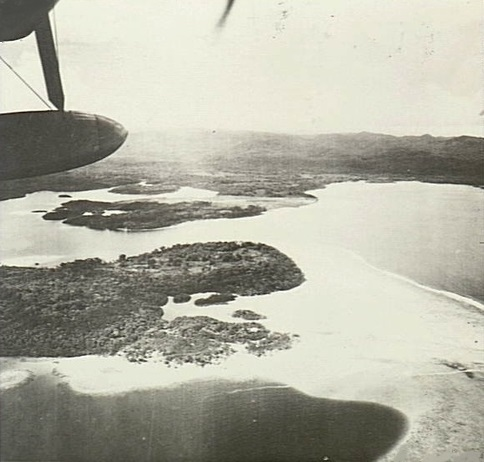
Airplane flying over Gasmata, looking North

Gasmata is a village on the southern coast of New Britain, Papua New Guinea located at 6° 16' 60S 150° 19' 60E. There is a Gasmata Airport in Surumi Peninsula area adjacent. The village is administered under Gasmata Rural LLG in East New Britain Province.

The Imperial Japanese occupied the village between 8–9 February 1942 during World War II. A war crime occurred in March 1942 when between eight and ten Australian prisoners of war were executed by firing squad by being shot in the back.

Gasmata was re-occupied by an Australian Army unit on 28 March 1944.

== Climate ==
Gasmata has a tropical rainforest climate (Af) with heavy to very heavy rainfall year-round and with extremely heavy rainfall from June to August. Unlike many places in Papua New Guinea, Gasmata and the southern coast of New Britain experience a rainfall maximum during the south-east monsoon (low sun season) because the New Britain mountains block the north-westerly winds during the high sun season.

Climate data for Gasmata
Month	Jan	Feb	Mar	Apr	May	Jun	Jul	Aug	Sep	Oct	Nov	Dec	Year
Mean daily maximum °C (°F)	31.1 (88.0)	30.7 (87.3)	30.8 (87.4)	30.4 (86.7)	29.8 (85.6)	29.7 (85.5)	28.4 (83.1)	28.7 (83.7)	29.7 (85.5)	29.8 (85.6)	30.6 (87.1)	30.7 (87.3)	30.0 (86.1)
Daily mean °C (°F)	27.1 (80.8)	27.0 (80.6)	26.9 (80.4)	26.6 (79.9)	26.4 (79.5)	26.3 (79.3)	25.5 (77.9)	25.6 (78.1)	26.2 (79.2)	26.4 (79.5)	26.8 (80.2)	26.9 (80.4)	26.5 (79.7)
Mean daily minimum °C (°F)	23.2 (73.8)	23.3 (73.9)	23.1 (73.6)	22.8 (73.0)	23.1 (73.6)	22.9 (73.2)	22.6 (72.7)	22.5 (72.5)	22.7 (72.9)	23.0 (73.4)	23.0 (73.4)	23.1 (73.6)	22.9 (73.3)
Average precipitation mm (inches)	179 (7.0)	156 (6.1)	212 (8.3)	269 (10.6)	478 (18.8)	655 (25.8)	844 (33.2)	809 (31.9)	493 (19.4)	350 (13.8)	226 (8.9)	184 (7.2)	4,855 (191)
Source: Climate-Data.org
