= No. 5 Airfield Construction Squadron RAAF =

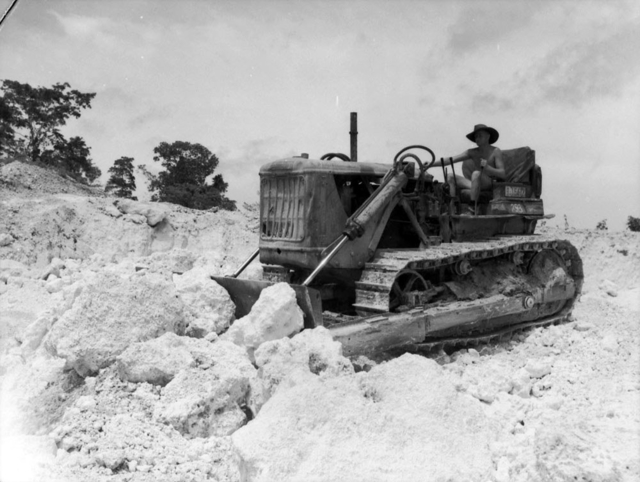
- A No. 5 Airfield Construction Squadron bulldozer working in a coral quarry at Noemfoor Island during December 1944
- Active: 1942–1949; 1951–1974
- Country: Australia
- Branch: Royal Australian Air Force
- Role: Airfield construction
- Engagements: World War II: New Guinea Campaign; Borneo Campaign; Vietnam War

Commanders
- Notable commanders: Arthur Mander Harrison (1945–1948, 1951–1959)

No. 5 Airfield Construction Squadron (5ACS) was a Royal Australian Air Force (RAAF) construction squadron. The unit was first formed in July 1942 and served in the New Guinea Campaign and Borneo Campaign during World War II. The squadron was one of only a few RAAF airfield construction units to be retained at the end of the war, and formed part of Australia's contribution to the occupation of Japan from 1945 until it was disbanded in June 1949. 5ACS was re-raised in August 1951 and worked on several RAAF airfields in Australia. It also provided small detachments of engineers to support RAAF deployments to South Vietnam and Thailand during the Vietnam War. The squadron was the RAAF's only airfield construction unit from 1961 onward, and was disbanded in December 1974.

== History ==
=== World War II ===
On 7 July 1942, 250 men of No. 1 Mobile Works Squadron were detached from the unit while it was stationed at Ascot Vale, Victoria and organised into a new squadron intended to serve in New Guinea. This unit was designated No. 1 Mobile Works Squadron (Special Works Force), and arrived at Port Moresby on 7 August after a difficult voyage during which the ship carrying it from Australia it ran aground twice. The squadron began work constructing Wards Airfield on 14 August, and the first of the airfield's runways was ready for use three weeks later. The airfield's completion was delayed until January 1943 due to shortages of personnel and equipment, however. No. 1 Mobile Works Squadron (Special Works Force) was redesignated No. 5 Mobile Works Squadron (5MWS) on 16 November. In order to support Allied offensives in New Guinea 5MWS moved to Goodenough Island between late February and March 1943 where it constructed Vivigani Airfield. This facility initially comprised a 1,524-metre (5,000 ft) fighter runway and 1,829-metre (6,001 ft) bomber runway as well as headquarters, maintenance and logistics facilities. During March and April a detachment from the squadron also assisted No. 6 Mobile Works Squadron at Milne Bay. 5MWS departed Goodenough Island on 21 November for a period of rest and reconstitution in Australia.

In early 1944 5MWS became part of a force of RAAF and United States Army aviation engineer units which were selected to build airfields at Aitape in New Guinea from which air support would be provided to Allied operations around Hollandia after US Army forces landed there on 22 April. 5MWS departed Melbourne on 15 February, and eventually joined up with the main body of the airfield engineer force at Lae on 1 April where it received training in infantry tactics. The Landing at Aitape took place on 22 April, and 5MWS came ashore the next day. The airfield at Aitape was ready to be used from 25 April and was later expanded by the aviation engineers. On 6 July 5MWS landed on Noemfoor Island where it again formed part of an aviation engineer force tasked with repairing and expanding the island's airfields. Allied forces had first landed on the island on 2 July, and it was still not secure when construction work began. As a result, 5MWS personnel were required to man perimeter defences, during which they captured 12 Japanese personnel. While at Noemfoor 5MWS was redesignated No. 5 Airfield Construction Squadron (5ACS) on 18 July. As at 25 November, No. 4 Airfield Construction Squadron and 5ACS were the main units of No. 62 Wing. This wing formed part of the Australian First Tactical Air Force, which was the RAAF's main mobile force.

In January 1945 4ACS and 5ACS moved to Biak island where they worked on improving facilities used by the US Army and United States Army Air Forces (USAAF). In mid-May 1945 4ACS and 5ACS traveled together to Morotai. They remained on this island until June when they departed as part of the Australian-led Battle of North Borneo. The two squadrons landed at Labuan on 11 June and worked on repairing and maintaining the island's airfield until the end of the war on 15 August.

=== Occupation of Japan ===
While most of the RAAF's airfield construction squadrons were disbanded at the end of the war, on 17 November 1945 5ACS was informed that it would form part of Australia's contribution to the British Commonwealth Occupation Force (BCOF) in Japan. For this deployment it was assigned to No. 81 Wing. 5ACS' advance party arrived in Japan in late 1945 and the rest of the squadron arrived at Iwakuni to the east of Hiroshima on 22 February 1946. At this time the unit was under strength as only 14 officers and 189 airmen had volunteered for occupation duties, though a further 173 personnel arrived in March and April.

5ACS provided engineering support to BCOF for the next three years. Its initial priorities were to repair the airfields at Bofu, Iwakuni and Miho. By mid-1946 5ACS was engaged in work on these airfields, building small forward airstrips for army reconnaissance aircraft and maintaining another four airfields in BCOF's area of responsibility. These tasks were of great importance to the BCOF, and Australian aviation historian Alan Stephens has written that "No. 5 ACS's achievements were probably the most significant of any Australian unit—land, sea or air" during the occupation of Japan. Japanese labourers and tradesmen were employed on all of 5ACS' projects, with the squadron's personnel undertaking specialist roles. The size of BCOF was reduced in 1948 and the Australian Government decided to reduce the RAAF force in Japan to a single flying squadron. Accordingly, 5ACS' remaining responsibilities were gradually transferred to the works officer of No. 77 Squadron and the squadron was disbanded at Iwakuni on 30 June 1949.

=== Cold War ===
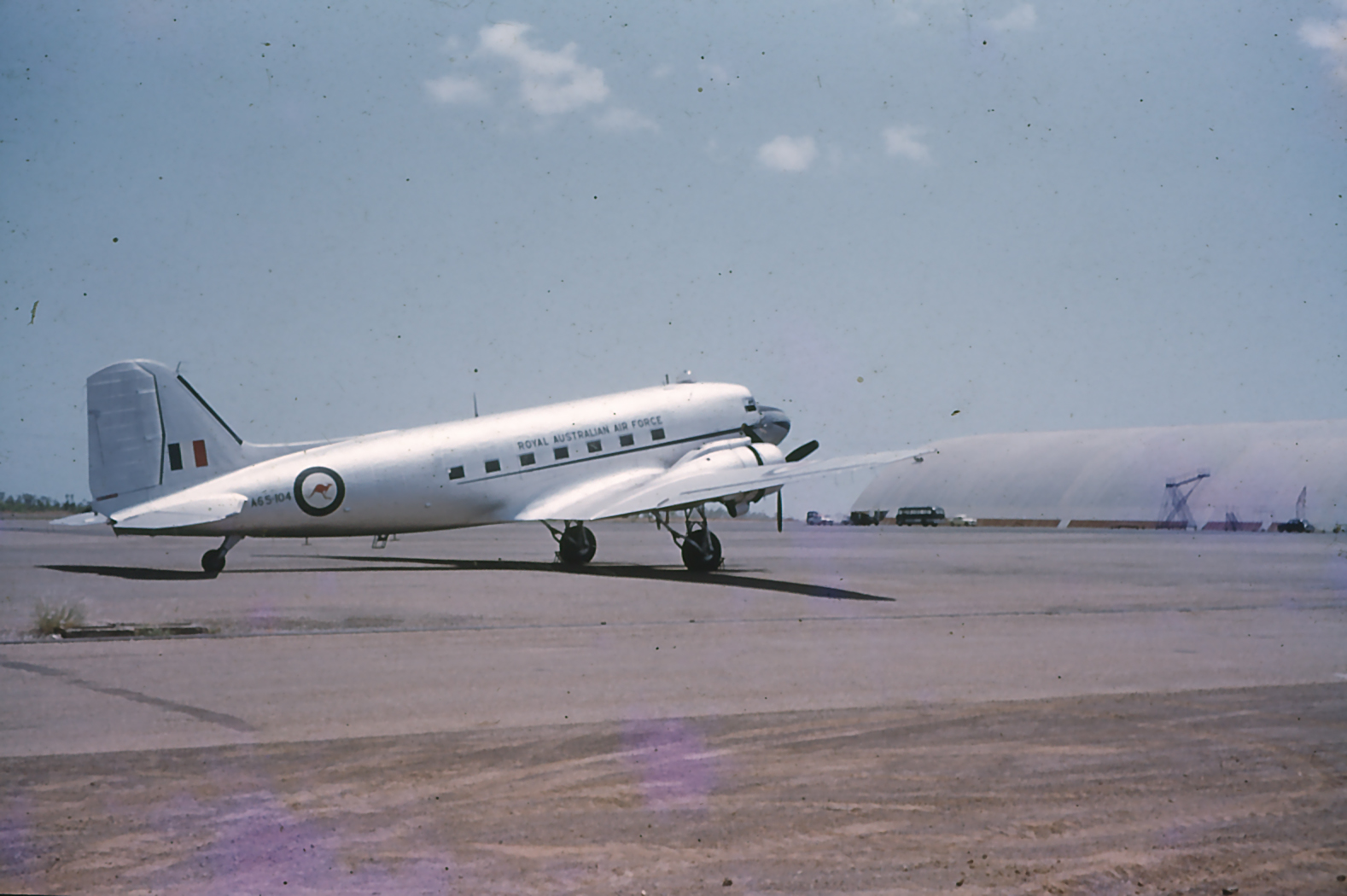
A RAAF Dakota transport at RAAF Base Darwin in 1961. This aircraft opened the new runway at Darwin when it was complete.

5ACS was reformed on 8 August 1951 at Bankstown, New South Wales to fill the RAAF's need for engineering units and provide a nucleus for the potential formation of other airfield construction squadrons. It initially worked on projects in Sydney before moving to RAAF Base Williamtown in 1952 where it undertook a major upgrade of that base which lasted until 1955. During this period, the squadron also worked on other RAAF facilities in New South Wales. Between March and November 1952 a detachment of 30 men from 5ACS was deployed to the Montebello Islands off the coast of Western Australia to support the British nuclear weapons test in the area, Operation Hurricane. Another detachment from the squadron assisted with the construction of range facilities at the Woomera Test Range in South Australia between 1952 and 1955. Most of 5ACS moved to Darwin in 1955 to build a 13,000-foot (4,000 m)-long runway and supporting facilities at RAAF Base Darwin, though a detachment remained at Williamtown until June 1963 and two other detachments were formed to undertake engineering tasks in the Sydney region and rebuild the runway at RAAF Base Amberley. The expansion of RAAF Base Darwin was completed in 1964. Following the disbandment of No. 2 Airfield Construction Squadron on 28 April 1961, 5ACS was left as the RAAF's only construction unit and took on some of 2ACS' personnel and equipment. For a short period the remnants of 2ACS was designated Detachment C of 5ACS while it completed works on RAAF Base East Sale; this sub-unit was disbanded in September 1961.

Once RAAF Base Darwin was completed 5ACS headed south to develop RAAF Base Tindal near Katherine in the Northern Territory. The squadron's advance party arrived at Tindal in October 1963 and work began on the base in late 1964. The 2,743-metre (8,999 ft) runway was opened in March 1967 and the base was ready to support RAAF units in early 1968. Work on expanding Tindal continued during 1968 and 1969. During this period detachments of 5ACS also worked on projects at Darwin and Amberley, and 5ACS' headquarters moved to Amberley on 14 September 1969.

Detachments from 5ACS formed part of Australia's contribution to the Vietnam War. Following the deployment of No. 79 Squadron to Ubon Air Force Base in Thailand in June 1962, a party of 5ACS personnel was also sent to Ubon to plan and oversee the construction of facilities for the squadron. Work on these facilities was undertaken by 100 Thai civilians who had built over 50 huts and other support infrastructure for No. 79 Squadron by the time the project concluded at the end of 1962. RAAF units began to be deployed to South Vietnam in 1964, and in May 1966 Detachment A of 5ACS was formed at Vũng Tàu to improve the airfield there so it could support the UH-1 Iroquois-equipped No. 9 Squadron. The 19 members of this detachment returned to Australia on 8 October 1966. Detachment B of 5ACS was subsequently deployed to South Vietnam in January 1967 to build facilities for eight No. 2 Squadron Canberra bombers at Phan Rang Air Base. This task was completed in April, and in June Detachment B moved to Vũng Tàu to complete the construction of facilities there. Work on Vũng Tàu Airport was finished on 20 January 1968 and the detachment was disbanded on 17 February 1968.

5ACS' last major project was the development of RAAF Base Learmonth in Western Australia. Initial works began on this project in March 1970 when Detachment E of 5ACS was formed there, and the main body of the squadron arrived on 1 February 1971. 5ACS' task was to extend the existing runway at the site and build facilities to support RAAF combat aircraft in the case of a war with Indonesia. These works were undertaken in difficult climatic conditions and the living conditions provided for the airmen and their families were inadequate. Nonetheless, the runway and extensive support facilities were officially opened on 15 December 1972, though further work needed to be completed at this time. In August 1973 it was announced that 5ACS would be disbanded. The squadron's strength declined during 1974 as personnel left the RAAF or moved to other units, and it was disbanded at Learmonth on 15 December 1974.

5ACS was the last of the RAAF's airfield construction units, and since its disbandment civilian contractors have been used to build and maintain air bases. A memorial plaque commemorating 5ACS was unveiled at the RAAF Memorial Grove outside of Canberra on 21 March 2014. In 2015 No. 65 Squadron was raised to centralise the RAAF's airfield repair and recovery capabilities: the '5' in its title was selected in recognition of 5ACS.
