= AWA 3B Wireless Set =

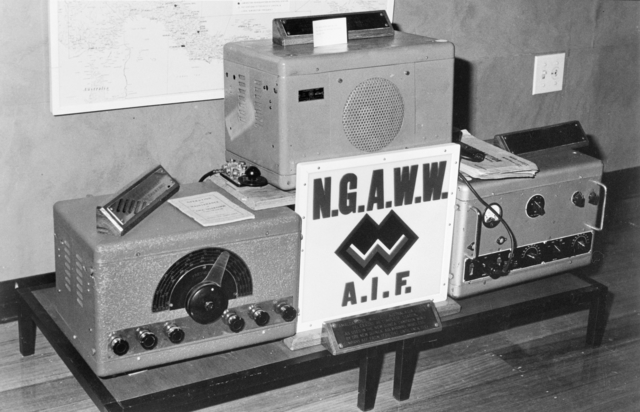

The AWA 3B Wireless Set was a wireless radio transceiver used by the Australian Army and Coastwatchers during World War II. The unit was made by Australian company AWA.
