= Army No. 101 Wireless Set =

The No. 101 Wireless Set was a wireless radio transceiver used by the Australian Army during World War II. The unit was manufactured by AWA.
