= Mud Bay, Goodenough Island =

Bay in Papua New Guinea

Coordinates: 9°28′S 150°20′E

Mud Bay is a bay on the south eastern coast of Goodenough Island in the Milne Bay province of Papua New Guinea.

In 1898, a mission station was established the village of Bwaidoga. The bay was the site of the landing of 520 troops of the Australian Army's 2/12th Infantry Battalion led by Lieutenant Colonel Arthur Arnold on 22 October 1942 as part of the Battle of Goodenough Island.
