= Beli Beli Bay =

Bay in Papua New Guinea

Beli Beli Bay is a bay on the eastern coast of Goodenough Island. It was utilised during World War II as an anchorage.
