= No. 7 Airfield Construction Squadron RAAF =

No. 7 Airfield Construction Squadron (7ACS) was a Royal Australian Air Force (RAAF) construction squadron. The unit was first formed in October 1943 as No. 7 Mobile Works Squadron and served in the New Guinea Campaign and Bougainville Campaign during World War II. In late 1944 the unit was assigned responsibility for the airfield at Aitape, Papua New Guinea, following withdrawal of the American 875th Airborne Engineer Aviation Battalion.

7ACS was disbanded in June 1947.
