= Gasmata Airport =

Airport in Gasmata, West New Britain, Papua New Guinea

- IATA: GMI; ICAO: AYGT

Summary
- Location: Gasmata, Papua New Guinea
- Elevation AMSL: 10 ft / 3 m
- Coordinates: 6°16′30″S 150°20′0″E

Map
- Location of airport in Papua New Guinea

Runways
Direction	Length		Surface
Direction	m	ft	Surface
09/27	820	2,690	Grass
- Source: PNG Airstrip Guide

Gasmata Airport (IATA: GMI) is an airfield in Gasmata in the West New Britain Province of Papua New Guinea.

== Facilities ==
The airfield is at an elevation of 10 feet (3 m) above mean sea level and has a 820-metre (2,690 ft) runway designated 09/27.

== Airlines and destinations ==
Tropicair
