= James Robertson (Australian Army officer) =

Australian stockbroker and soldier

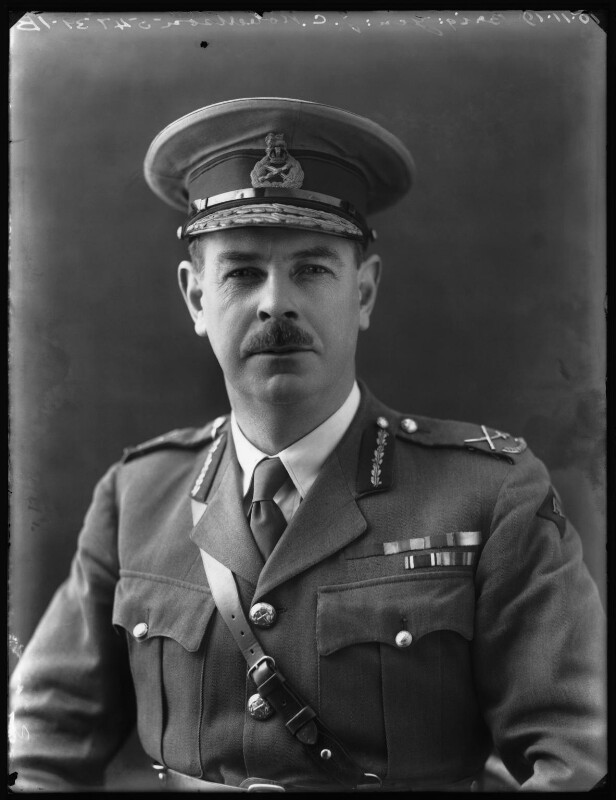
- Brigadier General James Robertson in November 1919
- Born: 24 October 1878; Toowoomba, Queensland
- Died: 22 January 1951 (aged 72); Toowoomba, Queensland
- Military career
- Allegiance: Australia
- Branch: Australian Army
- Service years: 1903–1944
- Rank: Brigadier General
- Commands: 7th Brigade (1921–26); 3rd Brigade (1920–21); 2/25th (Darling Downs) Infantry Regiment (1918–20); 6th Brigade (1918–19); 12th Brigade (1916–17); 9th Battalion (1915–16); 11th (Darling Downs) Infantry Regiment (1913–14)
- Conflicts: First World War; Gallipoli campaign; Landing at Anzac Cove; Western Front; Battle of Pozières; Battle of Mouquet Farm; Battle of Bullecourt; Battle of Messines; Battle of Passchendaele; Hundred Days Offensive
- Awards: Companion of the Order of the Bath; Companion of the Order of St Michael and St George; Distinguished Service Order; Colonial Auxiliary Forces Officers' Decoration; Mentioned in Despatches (7)

Brigadier General James Campbell Robertson, CB, CMG, DSO, VD (24 October 1878 – 22 January 1951) was an Australian stockbroker and a senior officer in the Australian Army during the First World War.

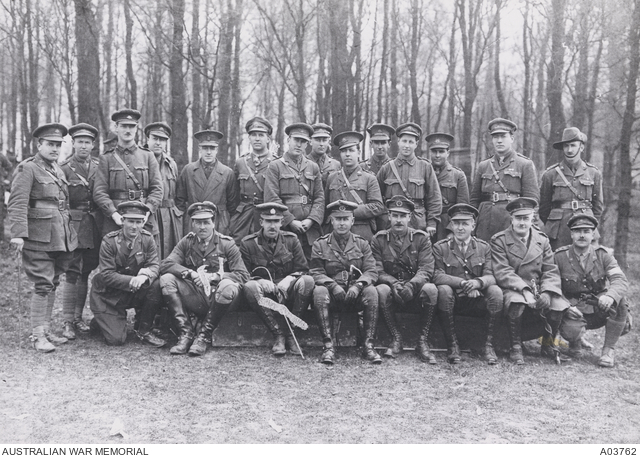
Informal portrait of officers who attended the 12th Australian Infantry Brigade Sports Meeting at Henencourt Wood, France, April 1917. Sat fifth from the left is Brigadier General J. C. Robertson, next to Major General W. Holmes.
