= 25th/49th Battalion, Royal Queensland Regiment =

Australian Army infantry battalion

- Cap badge of the Royal Queensland Regiment
- Active: 1875–1997; 1997 – present
- Country: Queensland; Australia
- Branch: Australian Defence Force; Australian Army
- Type: Reserve infantry
- Role: Line infantry (formerly); Light infantry
- Part of: 11th Brigade
- Garrison/HQ: Greenbank Military Range, Brisbane
- Mottos: Pro Aris Et Focis (For Altars and Hearths)
- Colours: Black over blue
- March: Southern Cross

Commanders
- Current commander: LTCOL Nicholas Perriman, DSM

Insignia
- Unit colour patch

The 25th/49th Battalion, Royal Queensland Regiment (25/49 RQR) is a Reserve light infantry battalion in the Australian Army, based in the state of Queensland. Although it was officially formed in 1997, the unit can trace its lineage back to units that were formed in 1875 as part of the colonial defence force of the state of Queensland. Additionally, in order to preserve the honours and traditions of the Australian Imperial Force, the battalion is the custodian of the battle honours awarded to two battalions that were formed for service during World War I. Following the end of the war, these units were raised again as militia units. During World War II, these battalions were called upon to participate in the fighting in the Pacific. Following the end of the war, these units were disbanded although they were later re-raised as part of the Citizen Military Forces, which was the forerunner to the Australian Army Reserve that exists today.

In 1960, the Pentropic division was introduced into the Australian Army and many of the old CMF units were disbanded or subsumed into the newly raised state-based regiments. As a result, the previously existing 25th Battalion became part of the 1st Battalion, Royal Queensland Regiment while the 49th Battalion became a special conditions unit responsible for training national servicemen who were unable to meet their training obligations due to their location. In 1965, however, the Pentropic division was discontinued and it was decided to reintroduce the regional numerical designations of many of the CMF battalions. In 1997, with the cessation of the Ready Reserve scheme the 25th and 49th Battalions were amalgamated to form the 25th/49th Battalion, Royal Queensland Regiment.

Up until 2007 the battalion was part of the 7th Brigade, headquartered at Enoggera Barracks in Brisbane; however, on 8 July 2007 the battalion was transferred to the 11th Brigade. It currently contains a mix of Reserve and Regular Army soldiers and has companies based across Southeast Queensland. In 2006, the Battalion provided the nucleus of a composite company of Reserve soldiers that deployed to the Solomon Islands as part of the United Nations Regional Assistance Mission. Individual members of the unit have also deployed to East Timor, Iraq and Afghanistan as part of the round-out and reinforcement program with the Regular Army.

== History ==
=== Early history ===
While 25/49 RQR was officially formed in 1997, it can trace its history back as far as 1875. On 20 January 1875 the 8th Company, Queensland Volunteer Rifle Brigade was formed in Toowoomba, Queensland, in order to meet the defence needs of the newly independent state of Queensland. This unit would later become part of the 4th Queensland (Darling Downs) Regiment, although when the colonial defence forces were amalgamated with the Commonwealth Military Forces following federation, the unit was disbanded in 1902. In 1911, the Australian government instituted a compulsory military training scheme. As a result of this the 11th (Darling Downs) Australian Infantry Regiment was raised. With its headquarters in Toowoomba, it had a recruiting area stretching from Oxley in Brisbane to Roma and at its peak had an establishment of 1,450 men. At the same time the 5th (Stanley) Australian Infantry Regiment was raised with its headquarters at Kelvin Grove in Brisbane and a recruitment area that drew in men from parts of the greater Brisbane and Ipswich areas.

=== World War I ===
When World War I broke out in August 1914 the provisions of the Defence Act 1903 did not allow conscripts to be sent overseas to fight. As a result, it was decided that the previously existing units of the Australian Military Forces, also known as the Militia, would not be sent overseas, but that instead new units, consisting entirely of volunteers, would be raised as part of the Australian Imperial Force. Although the militia units would remain in Australia on home service, many of their personnel volunteered for service as part of the AIF. Two units were raised at this time, which are a part of the 25/49 RQR's narrative: the 25th Battalion and the 49th Battalion, which were both formed initially with a majority of Queensland-based volunteers.

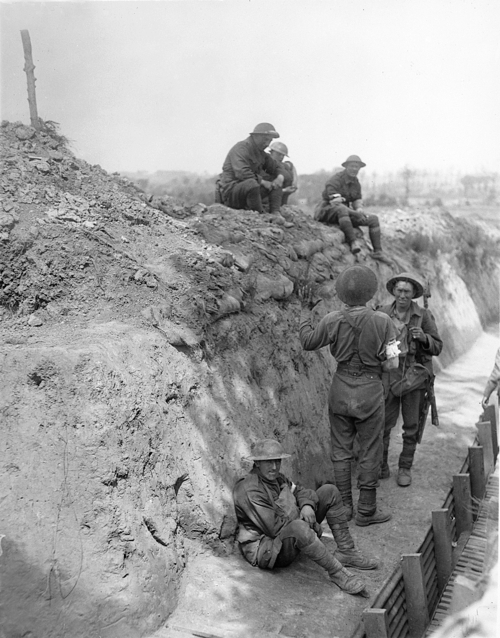
49th Battalion wounded during the fighting around Messines, 7 June 1917.

The 25th Battalion, AIF, was formed at Enoggera in early 1915 following the outbreak of World War I as part of the 7th Brigade, 2nd Australian Division and saw action at Gallipoli and on the Western Front. The battalion was disbanded in October 1918 due to manpower shortages in the AIF. It suffered almost four thousand casualties, including 1,026 killed and 2,821 wounded (including gassed). These losses represent the highest number of casualties of any Australian battalion that served during the war. The battalion was broken up in October 1918 to provide reinforcements to the 26th Battalion.

The 49th Battalion, AIF, was formed in Egypt in early 1916 as part of an expansion of the AIF that occurred after the Gallipoli Campaign. It formed part of the 13th Brigade of the 4th Australian Division and served on the Western Front. Having arrived in the conflict after the 25th Battalion, the 49th suffered fewer casualties, having 769 killed and 1,419 wounded. It was disbanded in 1919.

=== Inter war years ===
Following the end of World War I, the AIF was officially disbanded in 1921 and responsibility for the defence of Australia returned to the Citizen Military Forces (CMF). It was decided that the CMF would be re-organised along similar lines to the AIF and that numerical designations and unit identities of the AIF be maintained within the CMF. As a result of this, the 11th (Darling Downs) Australian Infantry Regiment became the 25th Battalion (Darling Downs Regiment), while the 5th (Stanley) Australian Infantry Regiment became the 49th Battalion (Stanley Regiment).

In 1930, as a result of manpower shortages, the 25th Battalion was briefly amalgamated with the 49th Battalion to become the 25th/49th Battalion but was then delinked in 1934. Prior to World War II the 49th Battalion was amalgamated with the 9th Battalion to form the 9th/49th Battalion and tasked with defending South East Queensland. With the outbreak of World War II the battalion was again delinked.

=== World War II ===
When World War II broke out in 1939 the fighting was initially confined to Europe and the Middle East. Once again it was decided to raise an all volunteer force for service overseas, this time known as the Second Australian Imperial Force. The militia would again be used to carry out home defence duties. This changed, however, in 1941–42 when the Japanese attacks in Malaya and at Pearl Harbor brought the threat of war much closer to Australia. The decision was made to bring part of the AIF back to Australia; however, in order to defend against a possible Japanese drive through Papua, elements of the Militia were sent to serve as garrison troops. As the situation worsened in 1942 a number of these units found themselves in the front lines.

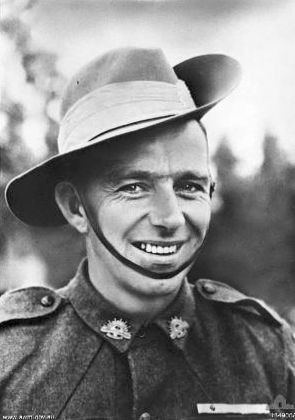
Reg Rattey, who received the Victoria Cross, for his actions while serving in the 25th Battalion during the Bougainville campaign in 1945.

In 1942, the 25th Battalion was deployed to Papua (then an Australian territory) where they took part in the Battle of Milne Bay and were part of the force that inflicted the first outright defeat on the Japanese land forces. In 1945, the 25th Battalion moved with the 7th Brigade, 3rd Division to Bougainville and initially saw action at Pearl Ridge in central Bougainville. In the severe fighting on the Buin Road in South Bougainville at Slater's Knoll, Corporal Reginald Roy Rattey of the 25th Battalion was awarded the Victoria Cross, the first award to a member of a Militia battalion. At the conclusion of the war the 25th Battalion was disbanded on 7 February 1946, having suffered 62 killed and 174 wounded.

The 49th Battalion was also deployed to Papua during the war and was initially tasked to defend Port Moresby. During the Battle of Sanananda in December 1942, as part of the 30th Brigade, the battalion was committed to a costly frontal attack in an effort to breakthrough to an American unit that was cut off, but suffered heavy casualties and was subsequently disbanded in July 1943. It suffered 97 killed, and 111 wounded, most of which came in a single five-hour period during the attack on Sanananda. Upon disbandment, its personnel were redistributed, with Militia members being transferred to the 36th Battalion and AIF members going to the 2/1st Battalion.

=== Post World War II ===
Following World War II the 49th Battalion was reformed as a CMF unit and in 1948 the 25th Battalion was also reformed as a CMF unit. In 1960, the CMF was reorganised into State based Regiments when the Australian Army introduced the Pentropic structure and the 25th Battalion was absorbed into the 1st Battalion of the newly formed Royal Queensland Regiment. In 1965, the Pentropic structure was abandoned and in an effort to restore some of the local connections of CMF units, the original numerical designations were restored. Thus, the 25th Battalion was reformed as a part of the Royal Queensland Regiment. With the Pentropic reorganisation, the 49th Battalion was re-raised as a remote area special conditions unit responsible for training national servicemen who, due to their residence in remote areas, had difficulty meeting their training obligations. In 1966, the battalion was re-raised as full battalion again, as part of the Royal Queensland Regiment.

In 1991, the 49th Battalion became a Ready Reserve Battalion and following the cessation of the Ready Reserve scheme in 1997 it was once again amalgamated with the 25th Battalion to become the 25th/49th Battalion. Since 1997 members of the battalion have deployed to Malaysia, East Timor, Sierra Leone, The Solomon Islands, Egypt, Bougainville, and Iraq. In 2006, a composite company made up of members of 25/49 RQR and 9 RQR deployed to the Solomon Islands as a part of the Australian Government (Federal Police/Australian Defence Force)-led mission known as RAMSI. This company, known as "Combat Team Southern Cross", was the largest independent sub unit to deploy on operations since World War II. In addition to this, members from 25/49 RQR have been involved in border security operations with the Royal Australian Navy as part of Operation Relex and have participated in a number of multinational exercises such as Suman Warrior as part of Rifle Company Butterworth and Exercise Talisman Sabre.

In early 2010, it was announced that in the future the battalion would relocate from Enoggera to Greenbank in the southern suburbs of Brisbane, to new facilities to be built there. These will include new buildings for battalion headquarters and two rifle companies, a new Q Store, a transport compound and accommodation. The battalion forms part of the 11th Brigade, which is force-assigned to the 2nd Division, and it is still currently headquartered at Enoggera.

== Lineage ==
The following list details the lineage of 25/49 RQR:

25th Battalion
1875–1902: 8th Coy, Queensland Volunteer Rifle Brigade/4th Queensland (Darling Downs) Regiment
1911–1921: 11th Australian (Darling Downs) Infantry Regiment
1921–1930: 25th Battalion, (Darling Downs Regiment)
1930–1934: 'B' and 'E' Coys, 25th/49th Battalion, (Darling Downs and Stanley Regiment)
1934–1946: 25th Battalion, (Darling Downs Regiment)
1948–1960: 25th Battalion, (Darling Downs Regiment)
1960–1965: 'B' and 'C' Coys, 1st Battalion, Royal Queensland Regiment
1965–1997: 25th Battalion, Royal Queensland Regiment.

49th Battalion
1911–1921: 5th Australian (Stanley) Infantry Regiment
1921–1930: 49th Battalion, (Stanley Regiment)
1930–1934: 'A' and 'D' Coys, 25th/49th Battalion, (Darling Downs and Stanley Regiment)
1934–1940: ? Coys, 9th/49th Battalion, (Moreton and Stanley Regiment)
1940–1943: 49th Battalion, (Stanley Regiment)
1966–1997: 49th Battalion, Royal Queensland Regiment.

== Current structure ==
25/49 RQR currently consists of the following companies:

- Battalion Headquarters – Based in Greenbank
- Alpha Company – Based in Toowoomba, Gatton, Roma, Dalby, Warwick, Wondai and Stanthorpe.
- Bravo Company – Based in Southport
- Charlie Company – Based in Loganlea
- Support Company – Based in Greenbank

== Battle honours ==
25/49 RQR carries battle honours from World War I and World War II. These battle honours were awarded to the AIF units raised for World War I and subsequently bestowed upon the militia units that were re-raised following the war. During World War II these units themselves earned a number of battle honours fighting in New Guinea and Bougainville. The unit also carries the battle honours awarded to the 2/25th Battalion, which was raised as part of the 2nd AIF and served in North Africa, Syria, New Guinea and Borneo.

The following is a list of the battle honours both of these battalions were awarded during these conflicts:

- World War I

25th Battalion: Gallipoli, Somme, Pozieres, Bullecourt, Ypres, Menin Road, Polygon Wood, Poocapello, Passchendaele, Amiens, Egypt, Albert, Mont St Quentin, Hindenburg Line, Prodseinde, Beaurevoir, France and Flanders.
49th Battalion: Somme, Poziers, Bullecourt, Messines, Ypres, Polygon Wood, Passchendaele, Ancre, Hamel, Amiens, Albert, Hindenburg Line, Epehy, France and Flanders, Egypt, Villers Bretonneux.

- World War II

25th Battalion: Milne Bay, Pearl Ridge, Mawaraka, Mosigella, Darara, Slaters Knoll, South West Pacific, Puriata River, Liberation of Australian New Guinea.
2/25th Battalion: North Africa, Syria 1941, Merjayun, Chenim and Rharife, Damour, Mazaraat ech Chouf, South-West Pacific 1942–1945, Kokoda Trail, Ioribaiwa, Eora Creek-Templeton's Crossing II, Oivi-Gorari, Buna-Gona, Gona, Lae-Nadzab, Lae Road, Liberation of Australian New Guinea, Ramu Valley, Shaggy Ridge, Borneo 1945, Balikpapan, Milford Highway.
49th Battalion: South West Pacific 1942–1945, Buna–Gona, Sanananda Road.

== Alliances ==
- United Kingdom – once The King's Own Scottish Borderers – then Royal Scots Borderers – now Royal Regiment of Scotland - via 25th Battalion & RQR
- Canada – The Lincoln and Wellard Regiment - via 49th Battalion & RQR
