= 61st Battalion (Australia) =

61st Battalion (Queensland Cameron Highlanders)
- Unit badge of the 61st Battalion
- Active: 1917; 1938–1946
- Country: Australia
- Branch: Australian Army
- Type: Infantry
- Size: ~550–900 men all ranks (Note: Upon the battalion's formation as part of the CMF in 1938, it had a strength of 550 men, however, upon mobilisation and the reintroduction of compulsory service this rose back towards 750. Later they were brought up to full strength and were established at 910 men, before being reduced to 803 men.)
- Part of: 7th Brigade, 3rd Division
- Garrison/HQ: Kelvin Grove, Queensland
- Motto: "A Cameron Never Yields"
- Colours: Black beside green
- Engagements: Second World War: New Guinea campaign; Battle of Milne Bay; Bougainville campaign; Battle of Slater's Knoll

Insignia
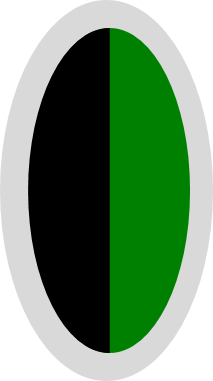
- Unit colour patch

The 61st Battalion was an infantry battalion of the Australian Army. It was originally raised in 1917 during the First World War but was disbanded the same year without seeing active service. Later it was re-raised as a part of the Militia in 1938 in Brisbane, Queensland. Upon the outbreak of the Second World War they initially undertook garrison duties in Australia, however, in 1942 they were deployed to New Guinea where they took part in the Battle of Milne Bay, during which the Japanese were defeated for the first time in a major land battle. In late 1943, the 61st Battalion was withdrawn back to Australia for a period of re-organisation and training before being deployed overseas again in late 1944. This time they were deployed to Bougainville, where the Australian 3rd Division had taken over from the American garrison and the battalion joined the drive towards the Japanese stronghold at Buin in the south of the island. Following the end of the war, the 61st Battalion was disbanded as part of the demobilisation process on 8 January 1946.

== History ==
=== Formation ===
The 61st Battalion was initially raised in the United Kingdom in February 1917 as part of the Australian Imperial Force (AIF) during the First World War in an effort to raise the 6th Division. However, following manpower shortages that occurred as a result of heavy losses amongst the AIF on the Western Front in 1917 and the failure of attempts to introduce conscription in Australia, it was decided to disband the division and its subordinate units in September 1917 and use their personnel to reinforce other units. As a result, the 61st Battalion was disbanded without seeing active service.

In 1938, the 61st Battalion was re-raised as part of the Militia in response to growing tensions in Europe. At this time, the battalion was formed in the Brisbane–Ipswich area with a small detachment based in Toowoomba. The main driving force behind convincing the government to establish the battalion was Sir Donald Cameron, and from the outset it was intended that the unit should be a Scottish battalion (Note: Other Australian Scottish battalions that existed at the time were the 5th Battalion (Victorian Scottish Regiment), the 16th Battalion (Cameron Highlanders of Western Australia), the 27th Battalion (South Australian Scottish Regiment) and the 30th Battalion (New South Wales Scottish Regiment).) and approval was gained for its personnel to be equipped with Scottish-style uniforms including kilts and Glengarry caps. (Note: These were mainly for ceremonial wear and the battalion did not wear kilts or Glengarry caps into battle during the fighting they took part in around Milne Bay or on Bougainville.) The funds for this equipment, however, were not provided for by the government and was a cost that the battalion had to meet itself, which it did so through an appeal for donations from the public. At this time many of the battalion's initial personnel were men of Scottish birth or ancestry, although later intakes of personnel included men of diverse heritage. In 1939, the battalion was officially bestowed with the title of the "Queensland Cameron Highlanders", when an alliance with the Queen's Own Cameron Highlanders was approved by King George VI.

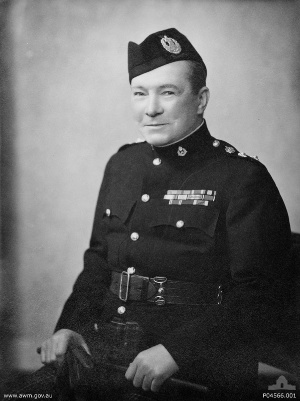
Sir Donald Cameron in the dress uniform of the Queensland Cameron Highlanders. Cameron was the main driving force behind garnering support for the establishment of the battalion before the war

Training was undertaken on a voluntary and unpaid basis with weekly parades being undertaken at Kelvin Grove, while field training took place at Fraser's Paddock in Enoggera and Redbank. By July 1939, the battalion's strength was 550 officers and other ranks.

=== Second World War ===
==== Home duties ====
At the outset of the Second World War, due to the provisions of the Defence Act (1903) which prohibited sending the Militia to fight outside of Australian territory, (Note: This stipulation also applied to the 2,800-strong Permanent Military Force.) (Note: Of the 32 Militia battalions that saw active service during the war, all but three were given AIF status. Essentially this meant that as more than 65 per cent of their wartime establishment had volunteered for service overseas, the battalion could be sent anywhere, including outside of Australian territory. The 61st Battalion was one of the 29 infantry battalions to receive this status.) the decision was made to raise an all volunteer force, the Second Australian Imperial Force (2nd AIF), to serve overseas—initial operations were conceived to be likely in the Middle East, France and later possibly England—while it was decided that the Militia would be used to defend the Australian mainland from possible attack and to improve Australia's overall level of readiness through the reinstitution of compulsory military service and extended periods of continuous periods of training.

Although ultimately the number of men that joined the units of the 2nd AIF from the Militia was in fact lower than anticipated, a large number of such personnel left to seek an opportunity to serve overseas. In this time the 61st Battalion lost many of its experienced senior officers and non-commissioned officers to the 2/25th and 2/33rd Battalions that were raised in Queensland, as well as to the Royal Australian Air Force. Of note was the loss of the battalion's pipe and drum band, which joined the 2/25th en masse. A 61st Battalion officer, Major Charles Withy, also went across with them serving initially as the second in command and then later as the 2/25th's commanding officer.

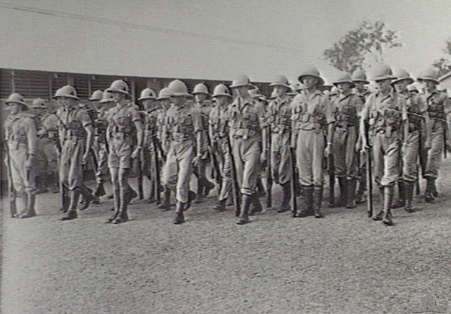
Men from the 61st Battalion on parade at Redbank, Queensland, in April 1940

Nevertheless, despite this loss of personnel the battalion undertook a number of periods of continuous training throughout 1940–42 as the Militia were called up progressively for various periods of extended training consisting of between 70 and 90 days. During this time they joined the rest of the 7th Brigade, to which they were assigned, at Chermside, Queensland. While there, the battalion replaced its Scottish equipment with regular service gear. In September 1941, as the strategic situation in the Pacific worsened, the battalion was "called up" to provide full-time service for the duration of the war. As a result of this, the battalion was brought up to its full strength of 910 personnel of all ranks. In December, after the Japanese attacks on Pearl Harbor and Malaya, they undertook defensive duties around Caloundra before moving to Townsville in May 1942 to defend against a possible invasion.

==== Milne Bay, 1942–43 ====
In early 1942, the situation in the Pacific grew worse as the garrison at Singapore fell and the Japanese began to advance south towards Australia. In March, they landed Lae and Salamaua on the north coast of New Guinea, and then later in July they landed at Buna and Gona in Papua. By this time the Australian government decided to bring the units of the 2nd AIF back from the Middle East to defend against a possible Japanese invasion of Australia and although this process had begun, the only troops available to respond immediately to the Japanese landings were units from the Militia. Troops from the 30th Brigade had already been deployed around Port Moresby, however, over the course of a month in July and August the 61st Battalion, along with the rest of the 7th Brigade, was moved to Milne Bay, situated on the eastern tip of New Guinea, where the 61st took up defensive duties around the airstrip at Gili Gili alongside the 25th Battalion.

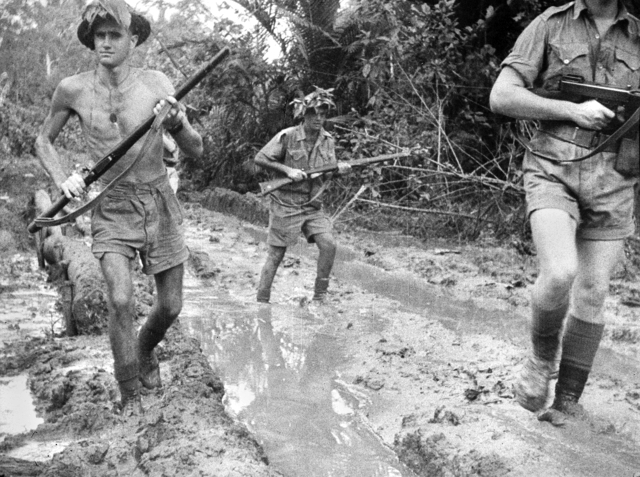
Men from the 61st Battalion on patrol after the Battle of Milne Bay

On the night of 25/26 August 1942 about 2,000 Japanese marines with tank support carried out an amphibious landing north of Milne Bay. As the Japanese advanced towards the 7th Brigade's main defensive position from their beachhead around Waga Waga, the 61st Battalion bore the brunt of the initial assault and temporarily halted the Japanese advance with an ambush before launching a counterattack against them. The following morning, however, after the 2/10th Battalion had come under attack from Japanese armour, the 61st Battalion was also forced back towards the No. 3 airstrip, where they formed a defensive line against the main Japanese thrust which came on 31 August. With strong artillery support, the 61st and 25th Battalions managed to turn back the Japanese attack, inflicting heavy casualties and in the process seizing the initiative. Following this, elements of the 18th Brigade advanced towards the Japanese beachhead, which they subsequently captured on 6 September, inflicting upon the Japanese their first defeat in a major battle on land during the war.

During its involvement in the battle, the 61st Battalion suffered 19 killed and 27 wounded. They remained at Milne Bay until March 1943, however, when they were withdrawn to Donadabu, near Port Moresby where the battalion undertook training exercises and carried out patrols around the villages that were scattered around the start of the Kokoda Track. As the battalion was brought back up to full establishment, they were warned out for combat on a number of occasions, however, eventually it was decided to withdraw the 7th Brigade back to Australia in November 1943. For his leadership of the battalion during this time, the 61st Battalion's commanding officer, Lieutenant Colonel Alexander Meldrum, was awarded the Distinguished Service Order (DSO). Captain Charles Bicks, who had commanded 'B' Company during the fighting around Milne Bay, also received a DSO.

==== New Guinea and Bougainville, 1944–45 ====
After a period of leave, the battalion began to reform on the Atherton Tablelands in Queensland during February 1944 and for the next eight months they undertook a number of exercises and training periods as they prepared for the next stage of the war. During this time, the battalion's authorised strength was reduced to 803 men of all ranks, as the 3rd Division was converted to the Jungle divisional establishment. On 20 July 1944, the 61st Battalion embarked upon HMAT Katoomba in Cairns and proceeded overseas again. They arrived at Madang in New Guinea four days later. As it was considered that there were still isolated pockets of Japanese in the area, the battalion began patrolling operations almost as soon as they had landed.

They remained at Madang, undertaking garrison duties, until November 1944 when the 61st Battalion was transferred to Torokina on Bougainville Island as Australian troops took over responsibility of the island from the American garrison. Initial Allied intelligence estimates placed the size of the Japanese forces on Bougainville at around 18,000 men, however, it was later determined that the number was closer to 40,000. Nevertheless, it was decided that the Australians would go on the offensive and would pursue a three pronged advance across the island, with the main effort being an advance in the southern sector along the narrow coastal plain towards the Japanese stronghold at Buin. Initially, the 7th Brigade, to which the battalion was attached, was employed in the northern sector holding positions along the Numa Numa trail, however, in January 1945 they took over from the 29th Brigade which had been operating in the southern sector and from then until March, the 61st Battalion took part in the advance inland from the Jaba River through Mosina, Sisirua, and Mosigetta towards the Puriata River.

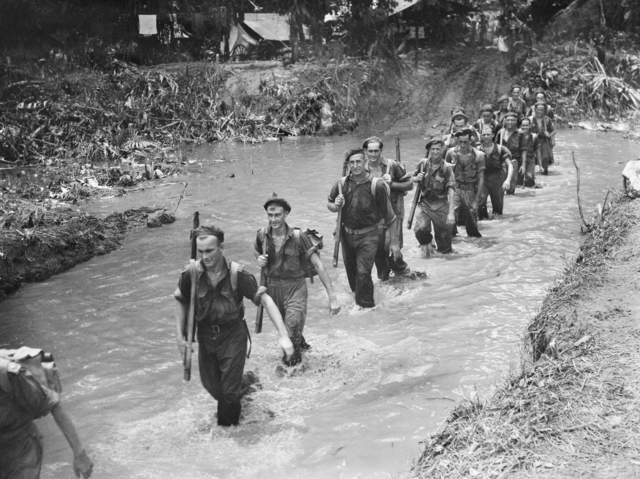
Men from the 61st Battalion patrol along the Mosigetta River on Bougainville in March 1945

Advancing in bounds, occupying company bases and sending out patrols, the battalion began its move south on 15 January 1945. Throughout the rest of the month, the battalion was involved in a number of relatively minor engagements with the Japanese as they carried out patrolling and ambush operations along the Australian line of advance. By the start of February they reached Mosina and after receiving intelligence that a Japanese force had been detected at Warapa, they sent out to raid their camp. Upon reaching Warapa the patrol set fire to the huts in which the Japanese force was billeted and then withdrew. Later reconnaissance determined that 15 Japanese had died in the blaze. By 12 February the battalion married up with patrols from the 25th Battalion that were moving along the Tavera River and then later, as the battalion continued on towards Mosigetta, one company linked up with patrols from the 9th Battalion on 17 February.

In late February, the Japanese forces around Mosigetta withdrew after pressure from Captain Ted Hutchinson's company in an action for which he was later awarded the Military Cross. The 61st Battalion, after establishing its headquarters at Mosigetta, continued its advance alongside the 25th Battalion. After the 25th Battalion crossed the Puriata, a patrol from the 61st strove for the Hari where they clashed with a group of between 15 and 20 Japanese holding an entrenched position. Upon establishing contact, the patrol's artillery forward observation officer called down indirect fire from the supporting artillery battery and as the patrol assaulted the position, the Japanese defenders withdrew, leaving six of their dead behind. The position was subsequently revealed to consist of four main pits and 20 other smaller ones. After this engagement the battalion was withdrawn from the line for a brief period due to concerns about its morale while the rest of the 7th Brigade continued the advance along the Buin road throughout February and into March.

Location of the Battle of Slater's Knoll in south west Bougainville.

Throughout March Japanese resistance steadily increased and during this time a number of attacks were made on the Australian rear areas and line of communications. As a result, the 61st Battalion was re-committed to the advance, with a company being allocated to defend the 25th Battalion's rear echelon along the Buin Road near a feature named "Slater's Knoll". As the Japanese launched a counteroffensive designed to check the Australian advance, the 61st Battalion's main engagement came between 29 March and 5 April when they took part in the Battle of Slater's Knoll.

On 30 March the battalion's 'A' Company was attacked six times by a Japanese force of about 300 men. This attack was repulsed for the loss of two Australians killed and two wounded. At dawn the following morning, 'A' Company attempted to clear the Japanese from the track that led back to Slater's Knoll, however, coming up against an entrenched force of about 70 Japanese, they were forced to abandon the attempt after exchanging fire for 45 minutes. Over the course of the next week, the Japanese launched a number of attacks on the Australians around Slater's Knoll, during which time they suffered an estimated 620 men killed and over 1,000 wounded. The main Japanese attacks, however, were concentrated on the 25th Battalion and for the majority of the battle the 61st took part in defensive operations on the periphery of the 25th's position to protect their rear and to provide close infantry support to the Matilda tanks of the 2/4th Armoured Regiment. During this time, the 61st Battalion was involved in a number of "minor contacts".

The incidents of disease and casualties, coupled with combat fatigue and poor leadership resulted in a poor state of morale in the battalion in this period. On 9 April, the 7th Brigade commander, Brigadier John Field, relieved the 61st Battalion's commanding officer, Lieutenant Colonel Walter Dexter, who had been suffering from arthritis, of his command. Major William Fry, formerly of the 9th Battalion, was given the task of temporarily commanding the battalion until Lieutenant Colonel Terrence Farrell could take over the following month. As problems with men refusing to go on patrol and lax performance of duty continued throughout early April, the 61st Battalion remained in the role of rear area security for the remainder of the 7th Brigade's involvement in the sector.

On 15 April, following the conclusion of the fighting around Slater's Knoll, the 7th Brigade was relieved by the 29th and they returned to Torokina where they remained until the end of the war. Over the course of the campaign, the 61st Battalion lost 48 men killed or wounded. (Note: For the period of November 1944 to May 1945, Keating provides the figures of one officer and 14 other ranks killed in action, 35 wounded in action, eight accidentally wounded. In terms of cases of disease requiring evacuation, Keating provides the figures of 20 cases of diarrhoea, 56 skin and 12 malaria for a total of 88 disease casualties in the 61st Battalion.)

=== Disbandment ===
Following the end of hostilities the 61st Battalion took part in the surrender ceremony that took place at Torokina. Later, as they were waiting for repatriation back to Australia, the battalion was employed guarding Japanese prisoners of war. In November orders arrived for the battalion to return to Australia and after embarking on the Westralia, they landed at Cairns on 19 November 1945, and moved back to Brisbane by train. As the battalion's strength dwindled as a result of the demobilisation process and men returned to civilian life, the decision was made to disband the unit. This occurred on 8 January 1946 at Victoria Barracks, Brisbane. (Note: There is a discrepancy in the sources regarding the battalion's date of disbandment. Various dates have been provided: 12 December 1945, 2 February 1946, and 8 January 1946. This final date is the date listed in the battalion's official War Diary.)

Casualties throughout the war consisted of 48 killed or died on active service and a further 56 wounded. Members of the battalion received the following decorations: two Distinguished Service Orders, three Military Crosses, eight Military Medals and 17 Mentions in Despatches.

== Alliances ==
The 61st Battalion held the following alliances:

- United Kingdom – Queen's Own Cameron Highlanders.

== Battle honours ==
For their service during the Second World War, the 61st Battalion received five battle honours:

- South-West Pacific 1942–1945, Milne Bay, Liberation of Australian New Guinea, Mosigetta and Puriata River. (Note: Despite being involved in the Battle of Slater's Knoll in March–April 1945, the 61st Battalion was not awarded the battle honour of Slater's Knoll. According to Gordon Maitland, when the eligibility for battle honours was being determined following the war there were many examples of similar inconsistencies.)

== Commanding officers ==
The 61st Battalion's commanding officers between 1938 and 1945 were:

- Lieutenant Colonel Alexander Meldrum, DSO
- Lieutenant Colonel Harold Joseph Wiles, DSO
- Lieutenant Colonel Walter Roadknight Dexter, DSO
- Lieutenant Colonel Terrence Joseph Farrell

== Notes ==
Footnotes

Citations
