= Borderers =

Borderers can mean any of the following:

- Those in the United Kingdom who live in the Anglo-Scottish or Anglo-Welsh border areas.
- The Borderers, a British television historical drama series based on life in the Scottish Middle March on the frontier between England and Scotland.
- Border_Reivers#Borderers_as_soldiers, persons, some or many who may have been Border Reivers, from the Anglo-Scottish border area recruited into various militaries of the British Isles
- UK military units
  - King's Own Scottish Borderers, UK Army unit drawn from the Anglo-Scottish border area
  - Royal Scots Borderers, UK Army unit drawn from the Anglo-Scottish border area
  - South Wales Borderers, UK Army unit drawn from the Anglo-Welsh border area
- Scotch-Irish Americans, referred to as Borderers by some scholars
