= Royal Queensland Regiment =

The Royal Queensland Regiment
- Cap badge of the Royal Queensland Regiment
- Active: 1 July 1960 – present
- Country: Australia
- Branch: Army
- Type: Reserve infantry
- Role: Light infantry
- Size: Three battalions
- Part of: Royal Australian Infantry Corps
- Garrison/HQ: 9th Battalion – Enoggera; 25th/49th Battalion – Greenbank Military Range; 31st/42nd Battalion – Townsville
- Mottos: Pro Aris Et Focis (For Hearths and Homes)
- March: Southern Cross

Commanders
- Colonel of the Regiment: Thomas Bradley (Governor of Queensland)

Insignia
- Abbreviation: RQR

The Royal Queensland Regiment (RQR) is a reserve light infantry regiment of the Australian Army based in Queensland. Part of the Royal Australian Infantry Corps, the regiment was established in 1960 following a reorganisation of Australia's part-time infantry regiments that saw the creation of six state-based regiments through the amalgamation of the previously existing regionally designated infantry battalions. Initially only two battalions were raised, but since then the size of the regiment has fluctuated depending upon the Army's requirements. There are currently three battalions within the regiment based at various locations throughout Queensland, all of which are assigned to the 11th Brigade.

== Current structure ==
The regiment currently consists of four battalions:

- 9th Battalion (9 RQR) – HQ based at Enoggera
- 25th/49th Battalion (25/49 RQR) – HQ based at Greenbank Military Range
- 31st/42nd Battalion (31/42 RQR) – HQ based at Townsville

Previous battalions include:

- 25th Battalion (25 RQR)
- 31st Battalion (31 RQR)
- 42nd Battalion (42 RQR)
- 49th Battalion (49 RQR)
- 51st Battalion (51 RQR) (Now 51 FNQR)

== History ==
The RQR was formed on 1 July 1960 as part of the reorganisation of the Citizen's Military Force, which saw all CMF battalions in each state amalgamated into state regiments. Initially, the regiment simply had a 1st and 2nd Battalion, which were established under the Pentropic divisional structure. It was initially designated as the "Queensland Regiment", but was granted the Royal suffix shortly after its establishment. Upon formation, the regiment was raised through the amalgamation of seven other regiments: the Moreton Regiment, the Darling Downs Regiment, the Wide Bay Regiment, the Byron Scottish Regiment, the Far North Queensland Regiment, the Kennedy Regiment, and the Capricornia Regiment. Through these regiments, the Royal Queensland Regiment traces its history through various units that were raised for service during the Boer War, World War I and World War II.

To perpetuate the old battalions of the 1st and 2nd Australian Imperial Forces, the two battalions were renumbered as the 9th Battalion and the 31st Battalion. Three further battalions (the 25th, 42nd and 51st) were formed in 1965, when the Pentropic structure was abandoned with the 49th Battalion formed a year later. In 1985, the 51st Battalion was separated from the rest of the Royal Queensland Regiment and reformed as the 51st Battalion, Far North Queensland Regiment, while the 25th and 49th Battalions were amalgamated into a single battalion in 1997. The 31st and 42nd Battalions were amalgamated in 2008. All three of the regiment's current battalions form part of the Army Reserve's 11th Brigade, which forms part of the 2nd (Australian) Division.

Since the late 1990s, the regiment's component battalions have deployed personnel in support of various overseas operations including Rifle Company Butterworth as well as deployments to East Timor, Solomon Islands, Afghanistan, Iraq, the Sinai, and various border protection operations.

== Battle honours ==
The Royal Queensland Regiment holds the following battle honours, which it inherited from various units raised from Queenslanders for service during the Boer War, World War I and World War II:

- Boer War: South Africa 1899–1902
- World War I: Somme 1916, Pozières, Bapaume, Bullecourt, Messines 1917, Ypres 1917, Menin Road, Polygon Wood, Broodseinde, Poelcappelle, Passchendaele, Ancre, Villers Bretonneux, Lys, Hazebrouck, Kemmel, Hamel, Amiens, Albert, Mont St. Quentin, Hindenburg Line, Épèhy, St. Quentin Canal, Beaurevoir, France and Flanders 1916–18, Anzac, Landing at Anzac, Defence of Anzac, Suvla, Sari Bair, Gallipoli, Egypt 1915–16
- World War II: North Africa, Giarabub, Defence of Tobruk, The Salient, Syria, Syrian Frontier, Merjayun, Jezzine, Chehim and Rharife, Damour, Mazraat ech Chouf, Hill 1069, Bandarene, South West Pacific 1942–45, Kokoda Trail, Ioribaiwa, Eora Creek–Templeton's Crossing II, Oivi–Gorari, Buna-Gona, Gona, Cape Endaiadere-Sinemi Creek, Sanananda–Cape Killerton, Milne Bay, Mount Tambu, Tambu Bay, Komiatum, Lae–Nadzab, Lae Road, Liberation of Australian New Guinea, Ramu Valley, Shaggy Ridge, Finisterres, Tsimba Ridge, Bonis–Porton, Artillery Hill, Pearl Ridge, Mawaraka, Mosigetta, Puriata River, Darara, Slater's Knoll, Hongorai River, Mivo Ford, Borneo, Balikpapan, Milford Highway.

== Alliances ==
The regiment holds the following alliances:

- United Kingdom – The Royal Scots Borderers
- United Kingdom – Black Watch
- United Kingdom – The Argyll and Sutherland Highlanders
- United Kingdom – The Duke of Lancaster's Regiment (King's Lancashire and Border)
- Canada – The Lincoln and Welland Regiment

== See also ==
- Royal Australian Regiment
- Royal New South Wales Regiment
- Royal Victoria Regiment
- Royal Tasmania Regiment
- Royal South Australia Regiment
- Royal Western Australia Regiment
- Pilbara Regiment
- Norforce
- Special Air Service Regiment

== Notes ==
Citations

Bibliography

- Festberg, Alfred (1972). The Lineage of the Australian Army. Melbourne, Victoria: Allara Publishing. ISBN 978-0-85887-024-6.
- Shaw, Peter (December 2010). "The Evolution of the Infantry State Regiment System in the Army Reserve". Sabretache. LI (4). Garran, Australian Capital Territory: Military Historical Society of Australia: 5–12. ISSN 0048-8933.
