= Reg Rattey =

Recipient of the Victoria Cross

Reginald Roy Rattey VC
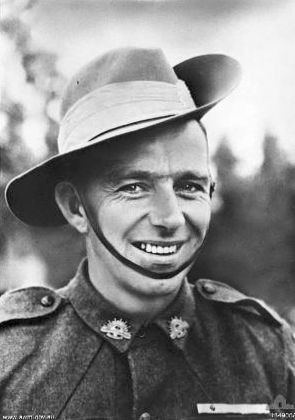
- Reg Rattey, c. 1945
- Born: 28 March 1917; Barmedman, New South Wales
- Died: 10 January 1986 (aged 68); West Wyalong, New South Wales
- Burial place: West Wyalong Lawn Cemetery
- Military career
- Allegiance: Australia
- Branch: Second Australian Imperial Force
- Service years: 1941–1946
- Rank: Sergeant
- Nickname: Reg
- Unit: 25th Battalion
- Conflicts: Second World War; New Guinea Campaign; Bougainville campaign
- Awards: Victoria Cross

Reginald Roy Rattey, VC (28 March 1917 – 10 January 1986) was an Australian recipient of the Victoria Cross, the highest award for gallantry "in the face of the enemy" that can be awarded to members of the British or Commonwealth armed forces. He was one of 20 Australians to receive the award for their actions during the Second World War, doing so while serving with the 25th Battalion during the Bougainville Campaign in 1945. After the war, Rattey ran a farm near West Wyalong, New South Wales. He died in 1986 at the age of 68.

== Early life ==
Born on 28 March 1917, (Note: The Daily News (Perth) in 1949 and Rattey's entry in the Australian Dictionary of Biography state that he was born in 1917, while Belham & Denham, and Rattey's entry in the World War II Nominal Roll state that he was born in 1918.) at Barmedman, in New South Wales, Reg Rattey was one of seven children born to a Lutheran family living in rural New South Wales. His father, Johannes Albert Rattey, who was originally from Springton, South Australia had married his mother, Anna Elisabeth (née Damschke), (Note: Rattey's entry in the Australian Dictionary of Biography records his mother's name as "Elizabeth Annie", while Harry Willey records it as "Anna Elisabeth".) at Pleasant Hills on 26 February 1914. Reginald was the couple's third child and when he was born, his father was working a share farm. Three years later he purchased his own property near Wargin, and after he bought another property called "Bon Accord", he expanded the family's holdings to 1,672 acres (677 ha).

In his formative years, Reg was schooled at Bellarwi, travelling by horse 6.5 kilometres (4.0 mi) each way, and was a keen sportsman playing cricket, football and tennis. After leaving school, he helped out on the family farm, and found work as a miner; he also joined the Militia, serving as a part-time soldier in the 21st Light Horse Regiment. When the war broke out, he was working at the Gibsonvale Open Cut Tin Mine at Kikoira and was parading with the 21st Light Horse Regiment at Wagga Wagga. Reg played rugby league for Barmedman in the Maher Cup in 1940.

== Second World War ==
In late September 1941, as the prospect of war in the Pacific against the Japanese grew, Rattey's regiment was mobilised for full-time service. The 21st Light Horse was subsequently redesignated as the 21st Reconnaissance Battalion, and Rattey served as a Bren carrier driver and then a driver-mechanic. As a member of the Militia, under the provisions of the Defence Act, Rattey was not allowed to serve outside of Australian territory, but in July 1942 he volunteered for overseas service as part of the Australian Imperial Force. He was transferred to 3rd Division's carrier company and then the 11th Division, and in September 1943 deployed to New Guinea, remaining there until April 1944 when he returned to Australia as a corporal. Two months later, he was transferred to an infantry battalion, the 25th Battalion, a Militia unit that had been raised in Queensland that was part of the 7th Brigade.

In July 1944, the 25th Battalion deployed to New Guinea where they were based around Madang until November when the battalion was transferred to Bougainville Island, landing at Torokina, where the Australians had taken over from the American force that had previously been fighting a campaign against the Japanese on the island. The Australians then began a three-pronged offensive in the northern, central and southern sectors of the island to clear the Japanese from the island. As part of this offensive, the 25th Battalion initially took part in the fighting in the central sector, and in late December fought in the Battle of Pearl Ridge before joining the southern drive on the Japanese stronghold of Buin in early 1945. By March they had crossed the Puriata River and begun moving inland towards a position that became known as "Slater's Knoll".

=== Victoria Cross ===
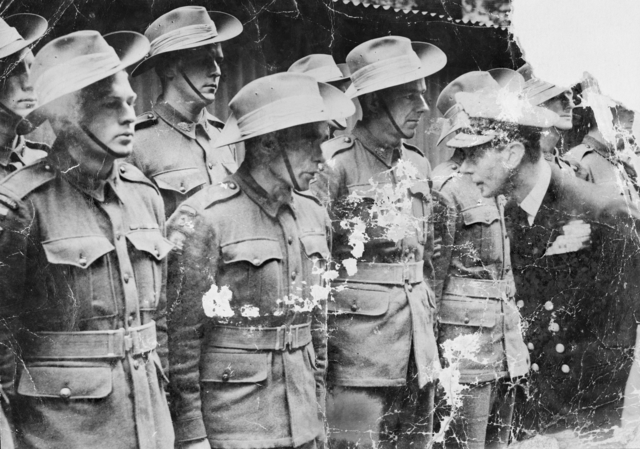
Rattey (3rd from left) meets King George VI at the Victory Parade in London, in June 1946.

On 26 July 1945, Rattey was awarded the Victoria Cross for his actions at Buin Road in South Bougainville on 22 March. The 25th Battalion were ordered to capture a Japanese stronghold following an allied air and artillery attack. After determining that an attack by his section would likely incur many casualties, he single-handedly attacked three Japanese weapons bunkers with his Bren gun. After eliminating one of the bunkers with a grenade, he returned to his section through enemy fire to obtain two more grenades and returned to destroy two more enemy bunkers.

Shortly after this, his section advanced and encountered further Japanese machine gun fire. Rattey again launched a solo attack on an enemy gun position, killing one, injuring another and causing the remaining gun crew to retreat. The section captured the Japanese machine gun with 2,000 ammunition rounds before advancing further. Two days after this action, Rattey was promoted to sergeant, and the following month his battalion was relieved shortly after holding off a large-scale Japanese attack during the Battle of Slater's Knoll.

== Post war ==
After returning to Australia, Rattey was briefly hospitalised with a bout of malaria and then briefly toured the country helping to raise money for the Australian Comfort Fund. He was discharged from the Army on 31 October 1945, and began farming a 2,400-acre (970 ha) property around Lake Cowal, near West Wyalong, which he was granted under a special lease. In March 1946, he returned to the Army, being granted the rank of sergeant to attend the Victory Parade in London, where he was presented his Victoria Cross by King George VI at Buckingham Palace. He was discharged from the Army again in September 1946 and returning to Lake Cowal. In 1948, Rattey married Emily Café, with whom he had one daughter. Emily died in 1954 and the following year he remarried, exchanging nuptials with Aileen Delaney at St Mary's Catholic Church, in West Wyalong; the couple would later have four children.

Rattey expanded his property at Lake Cowal by an extra 783 acres (317 ha), and eventually worked the land with sheep, cattle, pigs and wheat. Later, he also farmed tiger snakes for their serum. In his later life, Rattey's health deteriorated and he had to give up the land. He died on 10 January 1986 as a result of emphysema and was given a full military funeral at St Mary's Catholic Church, before being interred at the West Wyalong Lawn Cemetery. He was survived by his second wife and his five children.

== Honours and awards ==
Rattey's medals

In addition to the Victoria Cross, Rattey also received the 1939–1945 Star, the Pacific Star, the War Medal 1939–1945, the Australia Service Medal 1939–1945, the Queen Elizabeth II Coronation Medal and the Queen Elizabeth II Silver Jubilee Medal. He is also commemorated by the following memorials:

- A plaque in the Strand, London, which was one of 12 unveiled during Victory in the Pacific Day celebrations on 29 August 1995;
- A memorial cairn in Lions Park, West Wyalong, which was unveiled on 13 November 1992;
- Reg Rattey Drive, which was opened in West Wyalong, in March 1999;
- A memorial park in Canberra (part of the national Remembrance Driveway); and
- A soldiers' club at Larrakeyah Barracks.
