= 2/25th Battalion (Australia) =

Infantry battalion of the Australian Army

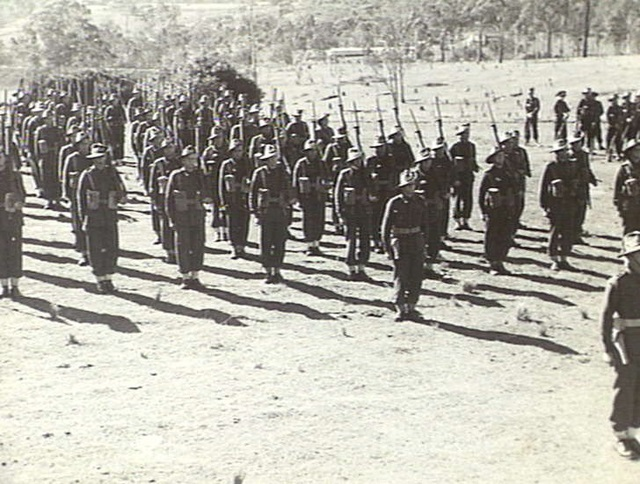
- Members of the 2/25th Battalion on parade at Strathpine in Brisbane during the Battalion's fourth anniversary parade in July 1944.
- Active: 1 July 1940 – 7 March 1946
- Country: Australia
- Branch: Australian Army
- Type: Infantry
- Size: ~ 750–950 men all ranks (Note: The battalion's establishment fluctuated over the course of its existence for varying reasons. Initially, upon formation adopted the traditional establishment which saw it at around 950 men all ranks, however, later in the war, the battalion was placed on the smaller jungle establishment of 803 men. See Palazzo 2004, p. 94.)
- Part of: 25th Brigade, 7th Division
- Motto(s): What we have, we hold
- Colors: Black over blue
- Engagements: Second World War: North African campaign; Syria–Lebanon campaign; Kokoda Track campaign; Salamaua-Lae campaign; Finisterre Range campaign; Borneo campaign

Insignia
- Unit colour patch

The 2/25th Battalion was an infantry battalion of the Australian Army which served during the Second World War. Raised in 1940, from volunteers drawn primarily from the state of Queensland, after completing its training the battalion undertook garrison duties in Darwin before deploying to the Middle East in mid-1941, as part of the 24th Brigade. There, it took part in more garrison duties in the Western Desert and in Palestine before it was reassigned from the 9th Division to the 7th Division and subsequently committed to the Syria–Lebanon campaign against the Vichy French. In early 1942, the 2/25th was returned to Australia to fight against the Japanese. Following this it took part in the fighting in New Guinea, undertaking two deployments there, firstly in 1942–1943 during which it took part the fighting along the Kokoda Track and around Buna–Gona, and then again in 1943–1944 when it helped to secure Lae before advancing into Finisterre Ranges. The battalion's final involvement in the war came in mid-1945, when it took part in the Borneo campaign, landing at Balikpapan. The battalion was disbanded in early 1946.

== History ==
=== Formation ===
Raised in Brisbane, Queensland on 1 July 1940 as part of the Second Australian Imperial Force (2nd AIF), the 2/25th Battalion formed at Grovely in the western outskirts of the city with its first personnel marching into the unit a fortnight later. Its first commanding officer was Lieutenant Colonel Norman Marshall, a veteran of the First World War who had served in the Militia prior to joining the 2/25th. Marshall oversaw the establishment of the battalion, which was achieved by bringing together a small number of Regular officers, volunteers from the Militia and men with no previous military experience who had enlisted following the outbreak of the war. The majority of the former militiamen were drawn from the Cavalry Brigade in Queensland and the 25th, 42nd and the 61st Battalions.

The colours chosen for the battalion's unit colour patch (UCP) were the same as those of the 25th Battalion, a unit which had served during the First World War before being raised as a Militia formation in 1921. These colours were black over light blue, in a diamond shape, although a border of gray in a circle shape was added to the UCP to distinguish the battalion from its Militia counterpart.

Consisting of a battalion headquarters, four rifle companies designated 'A' to 'D' and one training and reinforcement company (known as 'E' Company), the battalion conducted initial training at Grovely before moving to Darwin in October, where they relieved the 2/15th Battalion as part of the town's defensive garrison. Forming part of the 24th Brigade it was initially assigned to the 8th Division, before being transferred to the 9th Division in November 1940. In February 1941, the battalion returned to Brisbane aboard HMAT Zealandia, arriving in Brisbane after a nine-day voyage. For the next two months they were stationed at Redbank before they finally departed for overseas service in April 1941, moving to Sydney, by rail where they embarked upon the RMS Queen Mary bound for Egypt.

=== North Africa and Syria ===
The battalion arrived at Port Tewfik on 3 May 1941 from where they entrained and were moved by rail and then road to a camp near Ikingi Maryut. They remained there for roughly a week, undertaking further training as they received the rest of their equipment and weapons—sub machine guns, anti-tank rifles and mortars—before the men entrained again and moved to Mersa Matruh on the coast, whereupon they were transferred to the 25th Brigade, swapping with the 2/32nd Battalion. Amidst concerns of a German attack along the Egypt–Libya border, the battalion carried out the tasks of building and manning defences of the brigade's inner perimeter.

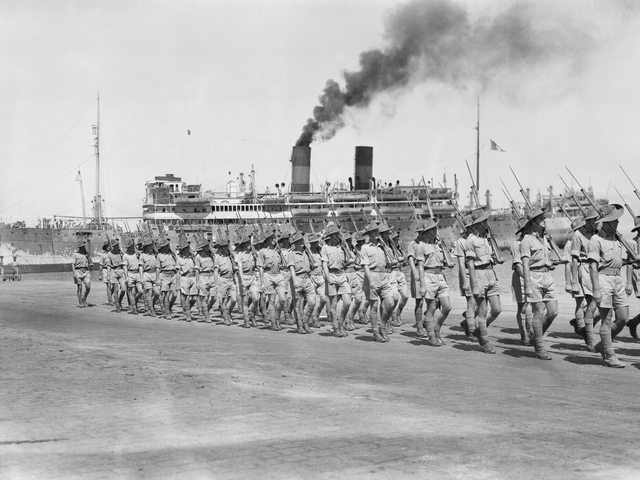
Members of the 2/25th Battalion in Beirut, September 1941

On 25 May they entrained once again, with the original plan of joining the garrison at Tobruk. These plans were changed, however, and the 2/25th along with the rest of the 25th Brigade moved to Palestine instead where they were transferred to the 7th Division, with whom they would remain for the rest of the war.

In June–July 1941 the battalion took part in the fighting against the Vichy French in the Syria–Lebanon campaign, during which it was initially placed in brigade reserve during the advance into Lebanon, which saw the battalion's companies split up as they were detached to the other three battalions of the brigade as required. Later they were reunited and on 19 June, after carrying out a grueling approach march over difficult terrain, the 2/25th launched its only major attack of the campaign in an effort to retake the town of Merdjayoun after a Vichy counterattack had recaptured it a few days earlier. Encountering a force of French tanks, however, the battalion's attack was ultimately unsuccessful and they suffered heavy casualties, as well as losing over 50 men captured. (Note: Most of these men were released and returned to the battalion following the armistice that was signed on 12 July. See Draydon 2000, p. 79.)

Most of the losses had come from 'B' Company and so it became necessary to merge the company with a platoon from 'A' Company. A few days later, on 25 June, the battalion was temporarily attached to the 21st Brigade and together they carried out a series of advances inland due to concerns of a possible French counterattack around Beit ed Dine, capturing a number of towns and villages along the way before an armistice came into effect on 12 July 1941. After this the battalion carried out garrison duties in Lebanon before being brought back to Australia in February 1942 to meet the growing threats in the Pacific following Japan's entry into the war in December 1941.

=== New Guinea campaigns, 1942–1944 ===
The 2/25th Battalion arrived in Adelaide, South Australia on 10 March 1942, having made the voyage from Egypt aboard the American troopship USS Mount Vernon. Following this they undertook training at Woodside Camp before moving north to Caboolture, Queensland in May. Undertaking marksmanship training at the rifle range at Enoggera in Brisbane and specific jungle training in July, later in early August the battalion carried out amphibious landing training, undertaking practice assaults on Bribie Island, before carrying out further marksmanship and physical fitness training as they prepared for the order to proceed overseas as the situation in New Guinea became quite serious. This order finally came on 31 August, following a brigade-level demonstration exercise that was viewed by General Douglas MacArthur the previous day.

Embarking on the SS Van De Lijn and Katoomba on 1 September 1942, the battalion proceeded to Port Moresby, via Townsville. The voyage was not without incident, as the Van De Lijn was involved in a collision with the troopship Perthshire, resulting in the death of one member of the 2/25th Battalion and injuries to five others. Nevertheless, they arrived in Port Moresby on 9 September, after having put into Townsville for a couple of days before proceeding on to New Guinea.

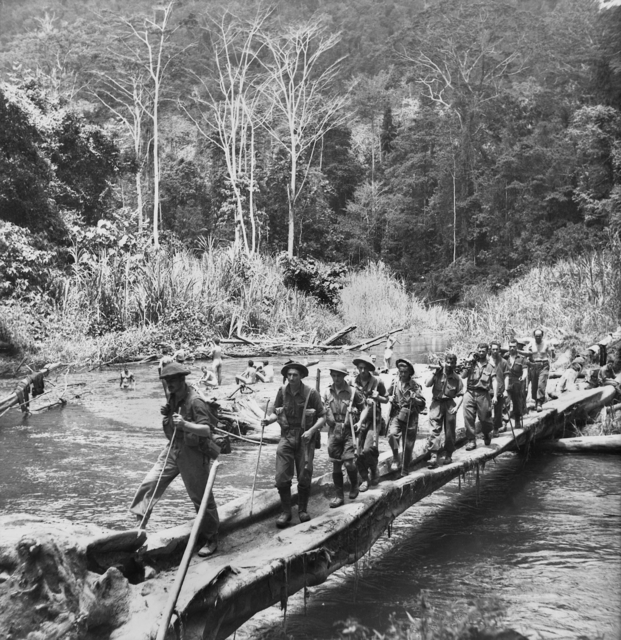
Men from the 2/25th and 2/33rd Battalions cross the Brown River during a patrol in October 1942

They spent two days at a staging camp at Murray Barracks where they were issued the new jungle green uniforms before setting out on 11 September, along with the rest of the 25th Brigade, to carry out the march towards Ioribaiwa. Arriving there on 15 September, they took part in the last Australian withdrawal of the campaign, falling back on Imita Ridge, before the Japanese themselves were forced to withdraw having exhausted their supply lines. Following this, the battalion took part in the Australian advance towards Gona, subsequently taking part in significant battles at Templeton's Crossing and Gorari throughout October and November, before taking part in the Battle of Buna–Gona in late November–early December.

In December they move to a rest camp at Donadabu before finally, in January 1943, the battalion was withdrawn to Australia for rest and re-organisation. They remained in Australia for the next six months training on the Atherton Tablelands.

They returned to New Guinea, however, arriving at Port Moresby on 22 July, aboard the troopship Duntroon in advance of the 25th Brigade's advance on Lae. Billeted at the Six Mile Valley camp under canvas, they carried out a number of sub-unit level exercises which culminated in a brigade-level exercise in late August and early September before being flown to Nadzab on 7 September. From there they took part in the Salamaua–Lae campaign, which saw the 7th Division to which the battalion was attached drive on Lae through the Markham Valley. Advancing through the plantations that lined the Markham Road, they encountered only light resistance and the 2/25th, in the vanguard of the Australian force, was the first to enter the town on 16 September.

Later in September the battalion was flown to Kaipit, from where they carried out patrols in support of the Finisterre Range campaign, operating in an area that included the Markham and Ramu Valleys and the Finnisterre Range. During this time the battalion was involved in a series of relatively minor contacts, with the most significant coming on 13 September around Whittaker's Bridge, near Heath's Plantation, and then on the night of 12/13 December around the Evapia River and at Kesawai. It was during the fighting at Heath's Plantation on 13 September 1943 that Richard Kelliher, from 'B' Company performed the deeds that later led to him receiving the Victoria Cross.

In January 1944, the battalion handed over their area of responsibility to the 24th Battalion and was withdrawn back to Port Moresby. From there, it embarked for Australia in February 1944.

=== Borneo 1945 ===
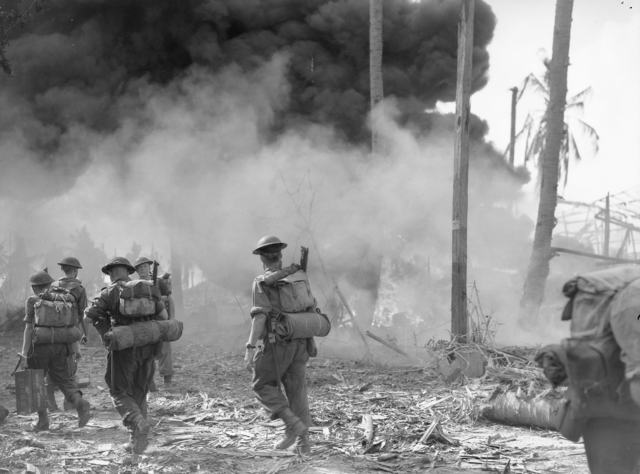
Members of the 7th Division at Balikpapan

For the next sixteen months, between February 1944 and June 1945, the battalion was stationed in various locations in Queensland, firstly at Strathpine, then later the Atherton Tablelands. On 19 July 1944, while at Strathpine, they celebrated their fourth anniversary. After sixteen months of re-organisation and training, the battalion finally received orders to proceed overseas again, embarking on the USS Cape Mendacino at Townsville they departed Australia on 2 June 1945 to take part in one of the last Australian campaigns of the war—Borneo. Landing at Balikpapan on 2 July, the battalion took part in the last major Allied amphibious operation of the war and the subsequent fighting that followed as the Australians moved inland.

The fighting took place mainly around Manggar airstrip as the defending Japanese employed delaying tactics of ambushes and booby traps, however, within three weeks the fighting was largely over. The battalion's involvement consisted mainly of carrying out fighting patrols and establishing observation posts along the axis of the main advance up the Milford Highway. Nevertheless, it was involved in a number of significant engagements throughout July as patrols came into contact with pockets of resistance and small Japanese force's attacked the battalion's observation posts before orders to cease aggressive actions came down from higher command in early August. Following that the battalion was involved in reconnaissance patrols as the war came to an end.

=== Disbandment ===
Following the end of the war the battalion remained in Borneo where they carried out various garrison duties, rounding up and guarding Japanese prisoners of war, collecting enemy equipment and stores, gathering evidence of war crimes and generally keeping the peace. As the process of demobilisation began some of its longer serving personnel who possessed over 150 points were returned to Australia, while other men were transferred to the 65th Infantry Battalion that was being formed to carry out occupation duties as part of the 34th Infantry Brigade, attached to the British Commonwealth Occupation Force. In February 1946, the battalion finally returned to Australia, arriving in Brisbane. It was subsequently disbanded on 7 March 1946. Throughout the war, a total of 2,745 men served with the 2/25th Battalion of whom 176 were killed or died and 365 wounded. Members of the battalion received the following decorations: one Victoria Cross, two Distinguished Service Orders, four Military Crosses with one Bar, one Distinguished Conduct Medal, nine Military Medals, one British Empire Medal and 33 Mentions in Despatches; in addition one member of the battalion was appointed a Member of the Order of the British Empire. (Note: There is a slight discrepancy between the Australian War Memorial source and Draydon's unit history regarding decorations. The AWM lists only eight MMs, while Draydon lists nine. Draydon also omits to mention the number of MIDs, while the AWM omits to mention the BEM that Draydon includes in his list. Draydon's list, however, seems more comprehensive as he includes the official citations for all honours except the MIDs.)

== Battle honours ==
For their service during the Second World War, the 2/25th Battalion received the following battle honours:

- North Africa, Syria 1941, Merjayun, Chenim and Rharife, Damour, Mazaraat ech Chouf, South-West Pacific 1942–45, Kokoda Track, Iroibaiwa, Eora Creek–Templeton's Crossing II, Oivi–Gorari, Buna–Gona, Gona, Lae–Nadzab, Lae Road, Liberation of Australian New Guinea, Ramu Valley, Shaggy Ridge, Borneo 1945, Balikpapan, Milford Highway.

In 1961, these battle honours were entrusted to the 25th Battalion, and through this link are maintained by the Royal Queensland Regiment.

== Commanding officers ==
The following officers commanded the 2/25th Battalion during the war:

- Lieutenant Colonel Norman Marshall, DSO and two Bars, MC (1940); (Note: Marshall subsequently obtained the rank of brigadier and went on to command the 27th Brigade. He was discharged in early 1942, probably due to bad health, and died later in September 1942.)
- Lieutenant Colonel Charles Burton Withy, DSO, MC (1940–1942);
- Lieutenant Colonel Richard Harold Marson, DSO (1942–1945). (Note: Following the end of the war Marson became the commanding officer of the 65th Infantry Battalion, and commanded that unit on occupation duties in Japan. He was later awarded the US Legion of Merit and commanded the 42nd Battalion, CMF in 1952 before retiring in 1955.)

== Notes ==
Footnotes

Citations
