= 49th Battalion (Australia) =

Australian Army infantry battalion

- Active: 1916–1919; 1921–1930; 1940–1946; 1966–1997
- Country: Australia
- Branch: Australian Army
- Type: Infantry
- Size: ~600–1,000 all ranks
- Part of: 13th Brigade, 4th Division; 30th Brigade
- Nickname: The Stanley Regiment
- Motto: Semper Fidelis (Always Faithful)
- Colors: Navy Blue over Sky Blue colors_label=Colours
- Engagements: First World War: Western Front; Second World War: New Guinea campaign

Insignia
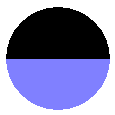
- Unit colour patch

The 49th Battalion was an infantry unit of the Australian Army. Raised as part of the Australian Imperial Force during the First World War, the battalion fought along the Western Front between mid-1916 and late 1918, before being disbanded in early 1919. In 1921, it was re-formed as a part-time unit based in the state of Queensland. Throughout the 1930s, the battalion was merged a couple of times as a result of manpower shortages, but in early 1940, as Australia mobilised for the Second World War, the 49th was expanded and the following year deployed to New Guinea to undertake garrison duty. Following Japan's entry into the war, the 49th was committed to the fighting in the early stages of the New Guinea campaign, taking part in the Battle of Sanananda in December 1942, where it took many casualties and suffered heavily from disease. The battalion was withdrawn back to Australia in early 1943 and subsequently disbanded in July, with the majority of its personnel being redistributed to other units. During the post-war period, the 49th Battalion was subsumed into the Royal Queensland Regiment, existing between 1966 and 1997, before being merged with the 25th Battalion to form the 25th/49th Battalion, Royal Queensland Regiment.

== History ==
=== First World War ===
The 49th Battalion was originally formed on 27 February 1916 as part of an expansion of the all-volunteer Australian Imperial Force, which took place after the failed Gallipoli Campaign, during the First World War. The expansion was undertaken by raising a new division in Australia – the 3rd Division – and by splitting the battalions of the veteran 1st Division in Egypt, using its experienced personnel to provide cadre staff for new battalions that would form the 4th and 5th Divisions. The 2nd Division, which had been sent to Gallipoli late in the campaign, remained intact. Upon formation, the 49th Battalion was assigned to the 13th Brigade, which was part of the 4th Division. The battalion drew its cadre staff – a total of 14 officers and 500 other ranks – from the 9th, which had been raised primarily from volunteers from the state of Queensland and had been in the thick of the fighting at Gallipoli, having come ashore during the landing at Anzac Cove in the first wave as part of the covering force provided by the 3rd Brigade. A further three officers and 470 other ranks from Australia brought the battalion up to full strength. The battalion's first commanding officer was Lieutenant Colonel Francis Lorenzo, who had previously served with the 10th Battalion, and it had an authorised strength of 1,023 officers and other ranks.

After forming at Tel-el-Kebir, the battalion moved 40 miles (64 km) to the Suez Canal where they undertook a period of training in the desert until early June. At that time, the four AIF infantry divisions that were based in Egypt were transferred to Europe, where they would later be joined by the 3rd Division, which undertook its initial training in Australia before finalising its preparations in the United Kingdom at the end of the year. Sailing on the transport Arcadian, the 49th Battalion landed in Marseilles, France, on 12 June 1916, and moved up to the front line around Strazelle, arriving on 21 June. For the next two-and-a-half years the battalion would fight in numerous battles in the trenches along the Western Front in France and Belgium. The battalion's first significant action came during the Battle of Mouquet Farm, taking part in two efforts in August and early September. Conceived as a follow on action to the Battle of Pozières to advance the line towards Thiepval to exploit a salient that had developed in the line, the battle proved a costly, and ultimately unsuccessful, introduction to the Western Front for the 4th Division. The first time they were committed in early August they suffered heavily from German artillery, and the second time, although succeeding in capturing the farm, they were eventually pushed back under the weight of strong German counter-attacks.

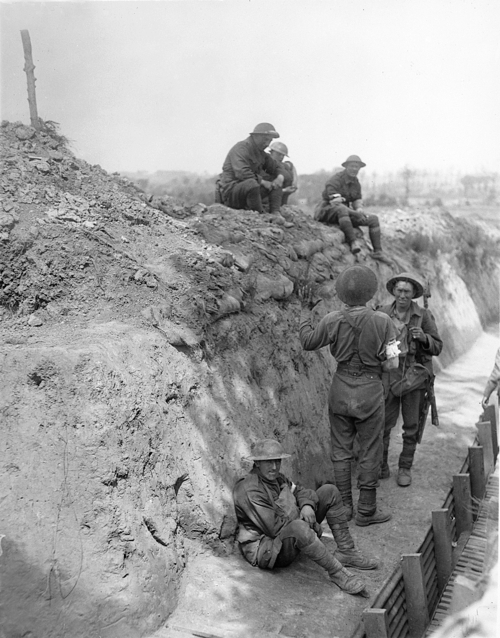
49th Battalion wounded during the fighting around Messines, 7 June 1917

The 49th Battalion suffered heavy casualties in making their debut – 14 officers and 417 other ranks killed or wounded – and did not take part in any more significant attacks for the rest of the year; nevertheless, they rotated through the front a number of times – firstly around Ypres and then later back in the Somme – where they conducted patrols and raids, in between periods of rest, training and manual labour in the rear. After enduring the harsh winter of 1916–17, early in the new year the Germans withdrew between 15–50 kilometres (9.3–31.1 mi) across a broad front between Arras and the Aisne, as part of a plan to shorten their lines and free up reserves. A brief advance followed, as the Australians followed their opponents up, before they were checked by the strongly prepared defences of the Hindenburg Line. In early April, as a preliminary to the First Battle of Bullecourt, the 13th Brigade was thrown into an attack around Noreuil, during which the 49th was initially placed in brigade reserve, before putting in an attack that captured a railway cutting on the Cambrai–Arras line. Its next significant action came in June, after the AIF was transferred to the Ypres sector in Belgium, where a large salient had formed in the line. On 7 June the 49th joined the Battle of Messines where it advanced on the 13th Brigade's right, past Despagne Farm, into the Blauwepoortbeck Valley where they encountered German pillboxes for the first time. The German machine-gun fire was so intense that heavy casualties were suffered in the initial attack, particularly amongst the officers with every company commander killed. By the end of the battle, the 49th had suffered 379 casualties, with many being inflicted by their own artillery which had fallen on them during a German counterattack on 8 June. Further fighting was experienced in late September at Polygon Wood during the Third Battle of Ypres, as part of follow on actions after the success at Menin Road.

The Australians wintered in Belgium during which time they undertook mainly defensive actions as they held various positions along the line, but in early 1918 they were moved south to the Somme Valley. Following the collapse of Tsarist Russia in late 1917, the Germans were able to transfer large amounts of equipment and manpower from the Eastern Front to the Western Front and subsequently launched their Spring Offensive in March. Falling on the southern flanks of the sector held by the British Third and Fifth Armies, the offensive initially succeeded in driving the Allies back and in late March, as the Germans closed in on the vital railhead around Amiens, the five Australian divisions, which had been grouped together as part of the Australian Corps, were transferred to the Somme to help blunt the attack. The 4th Division took up positions around Dernancourt, along the River Ancre, and on 5 April played a significant part in repelling a German attack there during the Second Battle of Dernancourt, where in the words of author Chris Coulthard-Clark, the 4th Division "faced the strongest attack mounted against Australians during the war". For their part, the 49th Battalion, supported by part of the 45th, put in a vital counter-attack late in the afternoon amidst heavy rain, which saved the situation for the Australians, whose line had been penetrated by a German counterattack across a railway bridge west of the town; in doing so they suffered heavily, though, losing 14 officers and 207 other ranks. Later in the month, they took part in the Second Battle of Villers-Bretonneux, launching an Anzac Day attack that successfully recaptured the town, which had been lost the previous day following an attack by four German divisions.

After the German offensive was halted, a brief period of lull during which "Peaceful Penetration" operations were carried out as the Allies sought to regain the initiative. On 8 August, the Allies launched their own offensive, known as the Hundred Days Offensive, which ultimately brought about an end to the war. The 49th Battalion took part in the initial fighting, attacking around Bray, but by the end of the month was rotated to the rear. The following month, commencing on 18 September 1918, the 49th undertook its final offensive action of the war, forming part of the divisional reserve during an attack against the Hindenburg Line's outpost line, as part of efforts to penetrate the forward part of the German main line in Picardy. Shortly after the attack, the Australian Corps, which had been heavily depleted by the fighting throughout 1918, was withdrawn from the line for rest and reorganisation. It did not return to the front before the armistice was signed on 11 November, and was subsequently disbanded on 9 May 1919 as part of the demobilisation and repatriation process.

According to the Australian War Memorial, throughout the course of the war the 49th Battalion lost 769 men killed and 1,419 men wounded. Members of the unit received the following awards: one Distinguished Service Order (DSO), two Officers of the Order of the British Empire (OBEs), 19 Military Crosses (MCs) with one Bar, seven Distinguished Conduct Medals (DCMs), 85 Military Medals (MMs) with eight Bars, six Meritorious Service Medals, 21 Mentions in Despatches, and 10 foreign awards. The unit also received a total of 17 battle honours, which were bestowed in 1927.

=== Inter-war years ===
During the inter-war years, the focus of Australia's defence planning was primarily upon the maintenance of a part-time military force, known as the Citizen Force. During the war years, this force had existed alongside the AIF, albeit largely only on paper. After the demobilisation of the AIF, a process which was only completed in early 1921, the Citizens Force was reorganised to mirror the divisional structure of the AIF, forming five infantry divisions and two cavalry divisions, and the previously existing structures were redesignated to adopt the numerical designations of the AIF units. Where possible, these units were allocated to the same geographical areas as those from which the AIF unit had been raised. Consequently, the 49th Battalion was reformed in south-east Queensland within the 1st Military District, headquartered at Kelvin Grove, with company-sized detachments at Toowong, Ipswich and Lowood; it was assigned to the 7th Brigade. Upon formation, the newly raised battalion drew personnel from the 9th and 52nd Infantry Regiments. In 1927, when territorial titles were adopted, the battalion assumed the title of the "Stanley Regiment" and adopted the motto of Semper Fidelis.

Initially, the manpower of the Citizen Forces was maintained through a mixture of voluntary and compulsory service, but in 1929–30, the compulsory training scheme was abolished by the newly elected Scullin Labor government and the Citizen Forces replaced by the all-volunteer Militia. The economic hardships of the period resulted in few volunteers, and by December 1929 the 49th Battalion's strength had fallen to just 108 men of all ranks. As a result, in early 1930 the 49th Battalion merged with the Toowoomba-based 25th to form the 25th/49th Battalion. In October 1934, amidst a wide-scale reorganisation of the Militia, the two battalions were delinked and the 49th was amalgamated with the 9th Battalion. They remained linked until July 1940, when the 49th Battalion was reformed in its own right as Australia mobilised for the Second World War.

=== Second World War ===
Throughout the initial stages of the war, the Militia battalions were used primarily to provide training for conscripts who were called up for short periods of continuous service once the scheme was re-established in January 1940. The provisions of the Defence Act prevented them from being sent overseas, though, and the main focus of Australia's combat effort was the all volunteer Second Australian Imperial Force. The 9th/49th, before it was split, undertook several concentrations in the early months, beginning in February 1940, firstly at Redbank and then later at Chermside. As tensions in the Pacific grew and the possibility of war with Japan became more likely, measures were taken to improve the defences of the islands to Australia's north. A detachment of around 200 soldiers from the 15th Battalion were sent to Port Moresby in the middle of 1940 and in October that year this detachment was transferred to the 49th. In March 1941, the rest of the 49th Battalion was dispatched to join the detachment in New Guinea, with a strength of 26 officers and 527 other ranks. At Moresby, the 49th was occupied mainly digging defences and labouring; some training was achieved, although it was largely rudimentary, and a small detachment was also sent to Thursday Island. Later, after the 39th and 53rd Battalions joined them, the 49th was transferred to the 30th Brigade. Boredom amongst the troops was high, though, and discipline described as "the worst ... in Moresby" according to the Australian War Memorial.

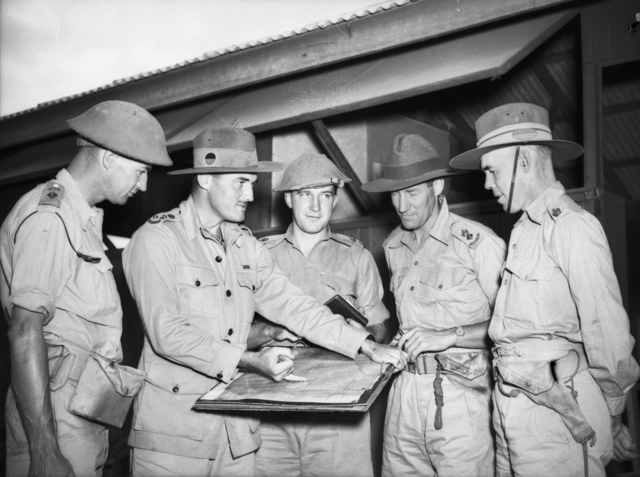
Officers from the 30th Brigade, including the 49th Battalion's commanding officer, Lieutenant Colonel Owen Kessels (first on the left), New Guinea, July 1942

The Japanese entered the war in December 1941 and as they advanced south towards Papua, the 49th found itself under air attack. Throughout the Kokoda Track campaign, an attempt was made to fly elements of the battalion to Kokoda to support the 39th Battalion during the Battle of Kokoda, but this proved abortive. Later, troops from the 49th Battalion joined Honner Force, an ad hoc unit tasked with conducting long-range patrols along the Goldie River to prevent the Japanese from cutting the track, while the rest of the battalion established standing patrols between the Goldie and Laloki Rivers. Although no contact was made with the Japanese, the combat role helped improve the outlook of the soldiers and morale improved. Throughout the preceding months the battalion's strength had been increased and by September 1942 it had a strength of 37 officers and 818 other ranks, including a draft of 12 officers who had been posted from experienced Second Australian Imperial Force units in August. The battalion continued to expand throughout October and November, by which time more than half its personnel had volunteered to transfer to the AIF. Training opportunities remained limited, though, even as preparations were made to send the unit into battle. Around this time, the battalion's machine gun company was detached and in conjunction with several other Militia machine gun companies, it was used to form the 7th Machine Gun Battalion.

As the tide of the fighting in Papua turned towards the Allies, the 49th Battalion joined the fighting on the northern coast around Buna–Gona. On the Sanananda front, the US 126th Infantry Regiment had become encircled around a position known as the Huggins Road Block on the road to Sanananda. Several attacks were launched in early December to break through to the beleaguered unit, but these all ended in failure. As ammunition began to run low, the 49th Battalion, supported by the 55th/53rd Battalion, was thrown into the battle, launching a frontal assault early on the morning of 7 December 1942. Attacking with all four companies, the 49th suffered heavily as it came up against heavy machine-gun fire from well-sited and concealed Japanese positions. Over the course of five hours, the 49th lost over 60 per cent of its assault force and the attack failed. A second attempt, supported by armour, on 19 December also failed to break through and resulted in further casualties.

For the remainder of the month the 49th remained at the front, but their actions were confined mainly to patrolling, providing fire support to neighbouring units and defensive operations. It had been deployed for nearly two years and many of its personnel were suffering from illnesses such as malaria, dysentery and scrub typhus. The almost constant rain and fetid jungle conditions resulted in increasing numbers of non-battle casualties and as the battalion's numbers dwindled, in early January 1943 it was relieved by the 2/9th Battalion and moved back to Port Moresby by air, concentrating around Donedabu with a strength of just 17 officers and 302 other ranks. A period of training and rebuilding was undertaken to prepare the battalion to return to the front, but in early March, they were ordered to Australia. Sailing upon the transport Duntroon, they disembarked in Cairns and after a period of leave concentrated on the Atherton Tablelands with the rest of the 30th Brigade, which now consisted of the 39th and 3rd/22nd Infantry Battalions. At this time, the government decided that the 30th Brigade would be converted to an all-AIF unit, and to conduct a period of intense training before sending it back to New Guinea. As a result, many of the 49th Battalion's Militia personnel were transferred to the 36th Battalion in late May, reducing the 49th to a cadre staff of just over 160 AIF personnel. Throughout June, the 49th Battalion took part in brigade exercises, but early the following month the decision was made that the 30th Brigade would be disbanded and used to reinforce the 6th Division, with reinforcements being sent specifically to the 16th and 19th Brigades. Consequently, the 49th Battalion was disbanded on 3 July 1943 and its remaining personnel were transferred to the 2/1st Infantry Battalion, with whom they went on to see further action, fighting in the Aitape–Wewak campaign with the 6th Division late in the war.

Casualties amongst the 49th Battalion are listed on the Australian War Memorial as 97 killed and 111 wounded, the majority of which were suffered during the fighting around Sanananda. Author Fred Cranston, who served with the 49th Battalion during the New Guinea campaign, disagrees with these figures, listing the 49th Battalion's casualties during the fighting around Sanananda as 14 officers and 282 other ranks killed or wounded, and 313 all ranks evacuated sick. Members of the battalion received the following decorations: one DSO, three MCs, one DCM, three MMs and 10 MIDs. For their involvement in the fighting in New Guinea, in 1961 the 49th Battalion was awarded three battle honours. Throughout the majority of their involvement in the New Guinea campaign, the battalion was commanded by Lieutenant Colonel Owen Kessels.

=== Post-war years ===
After the war, Australia's military was rapidly demobilised and then re-formed with the part-time element, the Citizens Military Force (CMF), being established in 1948. The force was recreated on a reduced scale, though, and there was no room on the order of battle initially for the 49th Battalion. In 1965, conscription was reintroduced in the form of the national service scheme, and this saw an influx of manpower into the CMF. The following year, the 49th Battalion was re-raised as a "special conditions" battalion within the Royal Queensland Regiment, catering for the training needs of men who were eligible for call up who elected to serve in the CMF rather than the Regular Army, but who could not parade regularly due to where they lived or what civilian occupation they held. The national service scheme ended in December 1972, after which many who had joined the CMF to defer national service took discharges. The immediate effect on the battalion was significant, with its personnel dropping from around 1,000 to approximately 200, but later it was able to rebuild its numbers to the extent that by 1982 it had a strength of 22 officers and 548 other ranks. In 1984–1985, the 49th Battalion was moved from the 7th Brigade, to the 6th, becoming that brigade's third infantry battalion. In 1991, the 49th Battalion became a Ready Reserve battalion, offering Reservists an increased training opportunity over and above normal Reserve service; when the scheme ended in 1997 it was once again amalgamated with the 25th Battalion to become the 25th/49th Battalion, Royal Queensland Regiment, and returned to the 7th Brigade.

== Battle honours ==
The 49th Battalion received the following battle honours:

- First World War: Somme, 1916–18; Pozières; Bullecourt; Messines, 1917; Ypres, 1917; Menin Road; Polygon Wood; Passchendaele; Ancre, 1918; Villers Bretonneux; Hamel; Amiens; Albert, 1918; Hindenburg Line; Epéhy; France and Flanders, 1916–18; and Egypt, 1915–16.
- Second World War: South-West Pacific 1942–43; Buna–Gona; and Sanananda Road.
