= Greenbank Military Range =

Coordinates: 27.7068°S 152.9884°E

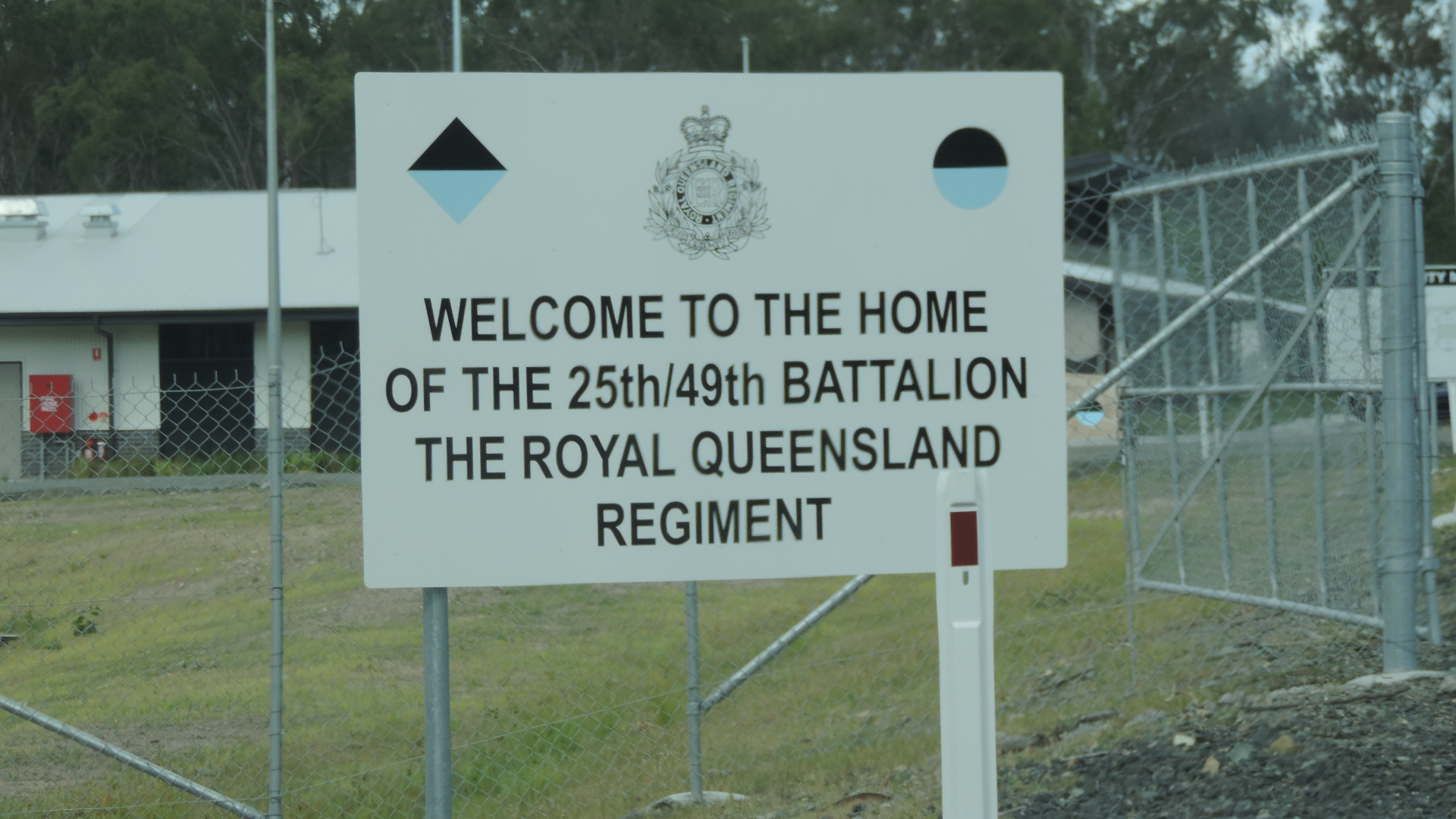
Sign for the 25th/49th Battalion, Royal Queensland Regiment, Greenbank Military Range, 2014

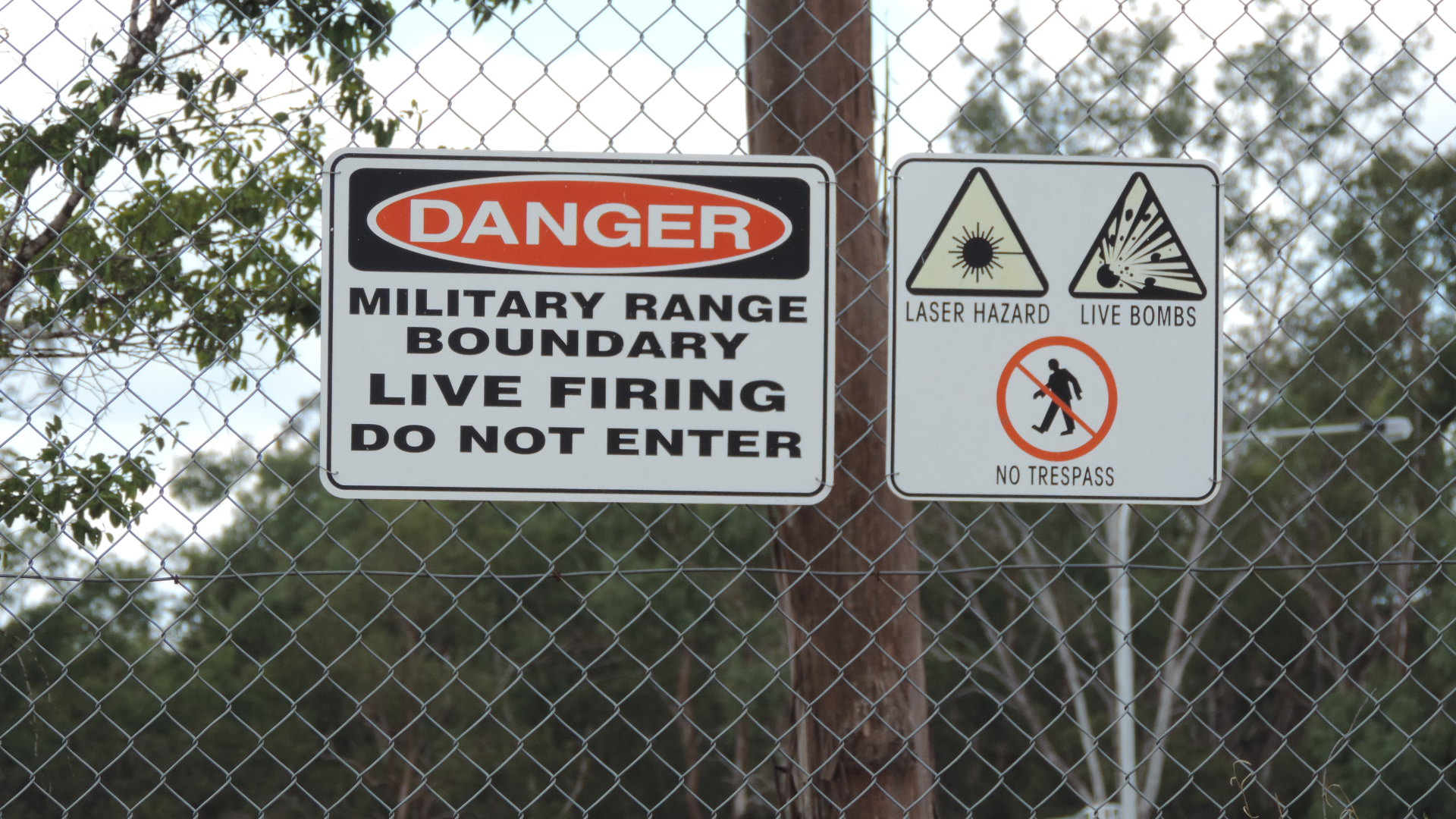
Danger signs surround the range, Greenbank Military Range, 2014

The Greenbank Military Range is a 4,500ha live training facility for the Australian Defence Force located in Greenbank, Logan City, Queensland, Australia, approximately 41.3 kilometres (25.7 mi) south-west of Brisbane. The location is heritage listed and also serves as a flora and fauna reserve. It has been the location of several controversial brumby cullings. Oxley Creek flows through the site.

In 1952, the site was established as the Greenbank Army Camp.

== History ==
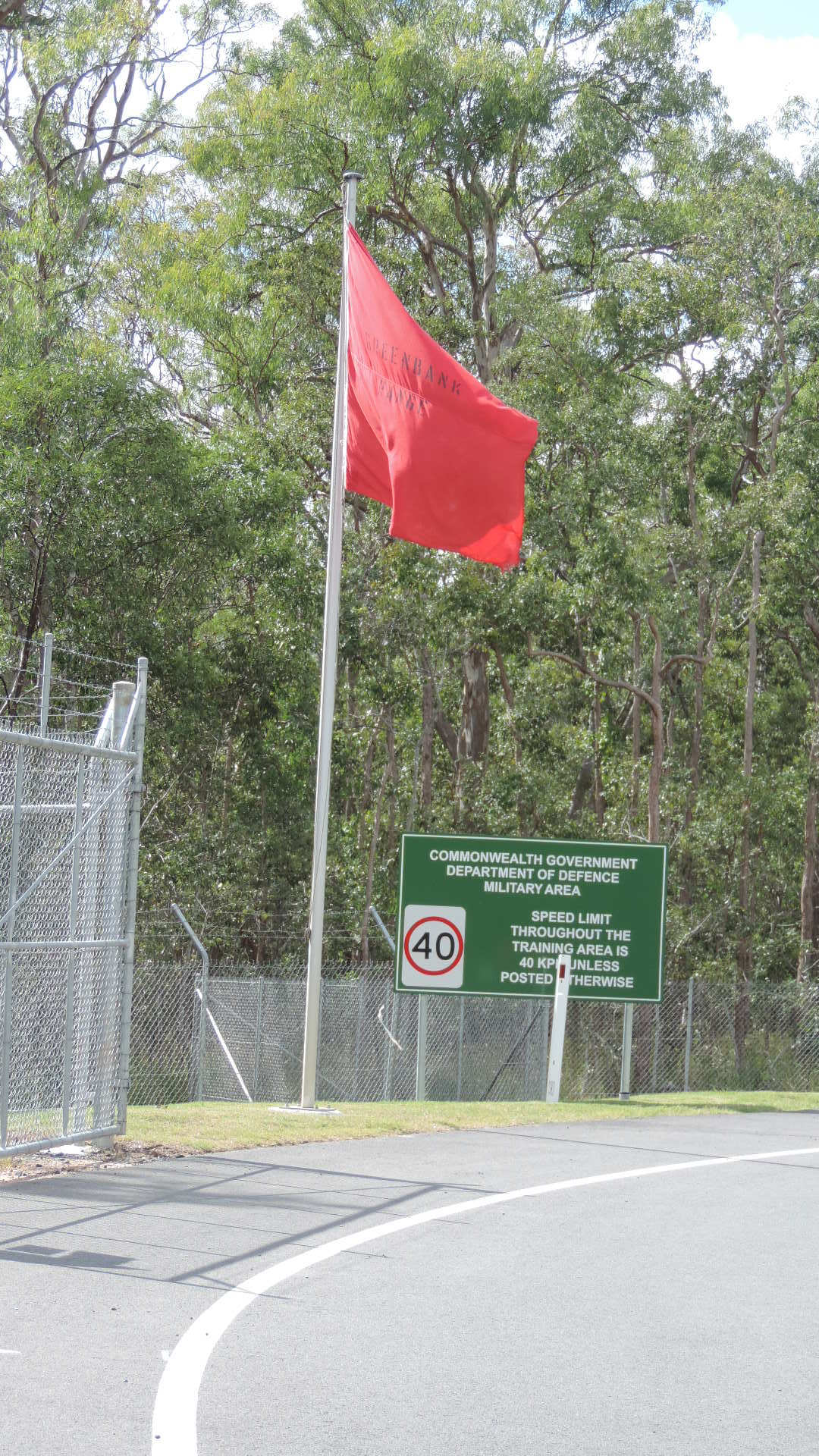
Greenbank Military Camp, 2014

=== 1945 Bristol Beaufort crash ===
On 10 April 1945, a RAAF Bristol Beaufort crashed at Greenbank after taking part in an air gunnery exercise at the Gailes Gunnery Range, killing all four crew members.

=== Inland Port Proposal ===
Tom Richman of the King's Counsel, (a biannual newsletter of King & Co Property Consultants) proposed in June 2007 that the Greenbank Military Range's land should be used for an inland port. Richman claims that an inland port at this location would greatly reduce current demands on the Port of Brisbane. He has suggested that the facilities at the range be moved to one of several other suitable locations that Richman has determined, the details of these locations are yet to be released.

=== Redevelopment ===
In early-2010 it was announced that Greenbank would be redeveloped with new facilities to be built there, while a reserve unit, the 25th/49th Battalion, Royal Queensland Regiment, would relocate there from Enoggera following completion. The new facilities will include new buildings for range control, a safe driving area and new lines for 25/49 RQR, including a battalion headquarters and two rifle companies, a new Q Store, a transport compound and accommodation.
