= Royal Scots Borderers =

Royal Scots Borderers, 1st Battalion, Royal Regiment of Scotland
- Active: 1 August 2006 – 1 December 2021
- Country: United Kingdom
- Branch: British Army
- Type: Infantry
- Role: Light Infantry
- Size: Battalion
- Part of: Royal Regiment of Scotland
- Motto: Nemo me impune lacessit (No One Strikes Me With Impunity)
- March: Charge: The Standards of the Braes of Mar; Quick March: Blue Bonnets o'er the Border; Slow March: The Garb of Old Gaul; General Salute: Loch Leven Castle
- Engagements: Operation Telic; Operation Herrick

Commanders
- Current commander: Brigadier Nicholas Wight-Boycott
- Royal Colonel: The Princess Royal

Insignia
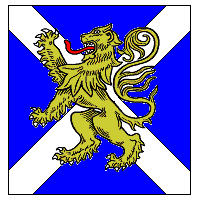
- Tactical Recognition Flash
- Tartan: Government; Royal Stewart (Pipers kilts and plaids)
- Hackle: Black

The Royal Scots Borderers, 1st Battalion, Royal Regiment of Scotland (1 SCOTS) was a battalion of the Royal Regiment of Scotland. The battalion formed on 1 August 2006 when its antecedent regiments - the Royal Scots and the King's Own Scottish Borderers - amalgamated just after the formation of the Royal Regiment of Scotland in 2006.

On 1 December 2021, the battalion was disbanded and its personnel formed the 1st Battalion of the new Ranger Regiment (1 RANGERS).

== History ==
When the Scottish infantry regiments amalgamated to form the Royal Regiment of Scotland on 28 March 2006, the Royal Scots and the King's Own Scottish Borderers initially maintained their identities as separate battalions; the 1st Battalion, Royal Scots became the Royal Scots Battalion and the 1st Battalion, King's Own Scottish Borderers became the King's Own Scottish Borderers Battalion. This was an interim arrangement, as the overall plan had always been to amalgamate the two into a single battalion.

This was not a new idea: the origins of the combined entity, Royal Scots Borderers, dates from the 1990 Options for Change review, when it was initially announced that the Royal Scots and King's Own Scottish Borderers would amalgamate. That amalgamation was subsequently rescinded. The Royal Scots Battalion and King's Own Scottish Borderers Battalion duly amalgamated on 1 August 2006 – upon their amalgamation, the new battalion took the name The Royal Scots Borderers, 1st Battalion, Royal Regiment of Scotland.

Since the amalgamation, the battalion has been deployed several times both to Iraq on Operation TELIC and to Afghanistan on Operation HERRICK, most recently to Afghanistan in September 2012 on HERRICK 17 as the Brigade Advisory Group and Operations Company. In September 2014, B Company deployed to Sierra Leone on Operation GRITROCK to help fight the outbreak of Ebola and in September 2015, the 1 SCOTS Battlegroup deployed on Operation TOSCA to Cyprus as part of the ongoing UN peacekeeping operations.

A written statement in December 2016 stated that it would be designated a Specialised Infantry battalion, reconfigured to provide an increased contribution to countering terrorism and building stability overseas. Following this change of role, the battalion would be assigned to the Specialised Infantry Group. In October 2017, the battalion officially joined the Specialised Infantry Group, and were due to move to Aldershot Garrison.

Under the Defence in a Competitive Age programme, the battalion helped to seed the 1st Battalion of the new Ranger Regiment, based at Palace Barracks, Northern Ireland.

== Uniform and traditions ==
=== Uniform ===
The battalion wore a flat black hackle behind the Royal Regiment of Scotland cap badge on the TOS (Tam o' Shanter) to distinguish themselves as the Royal Scots Borderers.

=== Recruiting & links ===
The battalion recruited its soldiers from Dumfries and Galloway, Edinburgh, the Lothians, Borders and parts of Lanarkshire, which were traditionally the recruiting ground of the Cameronians (Scottish Rifles) until they were disbanded in 1968. The battalion home headquarters was based at Edinburgh Castle for the Royal Scots and Berwick for the King's Own Scottish Borderers. A Company of 52nd Lowland, 6th Battalion, The Royal Regiment of Scotland maintains an affiliation to the 1st Battalion.

=== Battalion music ===
Battalion music includes:

- Charge: The Standards on the Braes of Mar
- Quick March: Blue Bonnets o'er the Border (from KOSB)
- Slow March: The Garb of Old Gaul (from R SCOTS)
- March on the Colours: Dumbarton's Drums (from R SCOTS)
- General Salute: Loch Leven Castle

=== Pipes and Drums ===
==== Role ====
Pipes and Drums have been a staple for Scottish and Irish regiments. 1 SCOTS pipes and drums were divided into two 'sections': Drummers, led by the Drum Major, and the Pipes led by the Pipe Major. Pipers and Drummers were classed as soldiers first and have an operational role in each battalion order of battle.

As part of the battalion's conversion into a 'Specialised Infantry battalion', the unit's pipes and drums were reduced to nil strength. However, after much conversation and debate with senior army officials, it was decided to reform the platoon and move them to Redford Barracks in Edinburgh. The pipes and drums would now support public duties again throughout Scotland, and could be deployed if needed. After their move to Edinburgh, the pipes and drums began recruiting again, however its establishment was effectively in a 'black economy'. Finally, on 15 February 2021, the pipes and drums were formally disbanded and its personnel distributed to other battalions of the Royal Regiment of Scotland.

==== Uniform ====
In short terms, because of their amalgamation, the pipers maintained the overall uniform of the Royal Scots (RS), while the drummers maintained the uniform of the King's Own Scottish Borderers (KOSB). General uniform worn throughout: Royal Regiment of Scotland Capbadge, Blackcock feather SCOTS pattern: For PM, DM, and SNCOS: archer green barathea doublet with golden braided shoulder wings and gold Russia piping. Wide gold braiding for PM and DM doublet. For OR pipers and drummers; white braided shoulder wings and white Russia piping. No medal ribbons. White collarless shirt or issued T-shirt, and black Scottish pattern black shoes.

The uniform descriptions below are specific to those sections and types.

Drum Major

Gold braid DM rank insignia and gold laurel wreath DM insignia. No cord and tassels, SCOTS pattern gold embroidered thistle, RS pattern DM baldric, DM sword belt, white and RS DM buckle, Crimson silk sash worn over right shoulder and under baldric, No. 8 RS Hunting Stuart trews. Broad sword with full basket and plated scabbard. RS pattern mace, and white gloves.

Drummers

SCOTS pattern glengarry, Gold braid rank insignia with drummer qual badge, Army pattern cord and tassels (red/blue/yellow), KOSB pattern gilt castle collar badges, military pattern drummer white sling cross belt, military pattern waist belt, white with KOSB drummer buckle, for SNCO only, issued red sash worn over right soldier, No. 7 KOSB Leslie tartan trews, KOSB Leslie tartan fly plaid and brooch, lowland patter gaiters, white canvas, and white buttons, Tenor and Bass drummers wore cougar skins on blue backing.

All Pipers

Dark blue pipers glengarry (scarlet tourie), Military pattern piper cross belt, black with KOSB accoutrements for PM and RS accoutrements for pipers. Royal Stuart kilts, SCOTS pattern stockings, footless, (red and black dicing), SCOTS pattern scarlet flat 4 inch flashes worn as per SCOTS legdress policy. Gaiters in Scottish pattern, white canvas with eight white buttons worn on the outside of the leg, secured by white canvas strap and no sword/mac/accoutrements.

Pipe Major

Gold braid PM rank insignia and pipes in gold laurel wreath insignia, no coard and tassels, KOSB pattern gold embroidered castle, military pattern waist belt, black with KOSB PM buckle, crimson silk sash worn over left shoulder and under piper plaid, KOSB PM kilt pin, white hair sporran with three black tassels. KOSB PM cantle, Royal Stuart scarf plaid with KOSB PM plaid brooch, PM KOSB dirk pattern, PM KOSB pattern Sgian-dubh.

Pipers

Gold braid rank insignia with piper qual badge, SCOTS pattern gilt thistle, Military pattern, black and TS piper buckle, for SNCO only, issued red sash worn over right soldier, RS pipers kilt pin, White hair sporrans with two black tassels, RS pipers cantle. Royal Stuart tartan scarf plaid with RS plaid brooch, Military pattern piper dirk, and SCOTS pattern Sgian-dubh.

== Commanding officers ==
Commanding officers have included:

- 2006–2008: Lieutenant Colonel Robert Bernard Bruce
- 2008–2010: Lt Col Charles L. G. Herbert
- 2010–2013: Lt Col Benjamin M. A. Wrench
- 2013–2015: Lt Col Matthew E. Munro
- 2015–2018: Lt Col Nicholas M. Wight-Boycott
- 2018–2021: Lt Col Andrew R. W. Watson

== Alliances ==
- Canada – The Canadian Scottish Regiment (Princess Mary's)
- Canada – Royal Newfoundland Regiment
- Canada – 1st Battalion, The Royal New Brunswick Regiment (Carleton and York)
- Australia – 25th/49th Battalion, The Royal Queensland Regiment
- Malaysia – 5th Battalion, The Royal Malay Regiment
- South Africa – Bambatha Rifles
- Royal Navy – HMS Edinburgh
- United Kingdom – Amiens Company Glasgow and Lanarkshire ACF
- United Kingdom – Minden Company, West Lowland Battalion ACF
- France – 27e bataillon de chasseurs alpins
