= 7th Brigade (Australia) =

Unit of the Australian Army

- Active: 1912–present
- Country: Australia
- Branch: Australian Army
- Type: Combined arms
- Size: 3,500 personnel
- Part of: 1st (Australian) Division
- Garrison/HQ: Brisbane, Queensland
- Engagements: World War I: Gallipoli campaign; Western Front; World War II: New Guinea campaign; Bougainville campaign

Commanders
- Current commander: Brigadier Giles Cornelia, DSM, CSM

Insignia
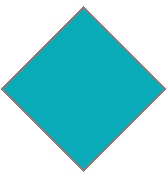
- Unit colour patch

7th Brigade is a motorised unit of the Australian Army tasked with operating by air or sea in response to regional emergencies. The brigade was first raised in 1912 as a Militia formation, although it was re-formed as part of the First Australian Imperial Force in early 1915 for service during World War I. It subsequently saw action at Gallipoli and on the Western Front during the war. Following the end of the war the brigade was disbanded in 1919 before being re-raised in 1921 as part of the Citizens Force (later known as the Militia). During World War II the brigade took part in the fighting against the Japanese in New Guinea and on Bougainville. Today, the 7th Brigade is part of 1st (Australian) Division and is based in Brisbane, Queensland and is composed mainly of units of the Regular Army. While the brigade has not deployed as a whole unit since World War II, component units have deployed on operations to East Timor, the Solomon Islands, Iraq and Afghanistan.

As of 2024, the 7th Brigade is Australia's "Ready Brigade" and generates a "Ready Battle Group".

== History ==
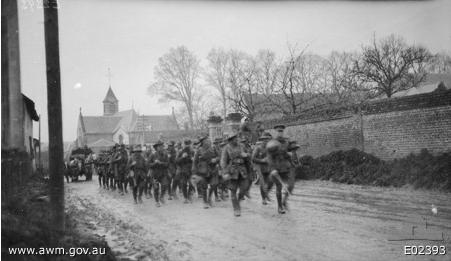
27th Battalion, 2nd Division, enters the town of Beaucourt-sur-l'Ancre in the Somme, France.

The 7th Brigade traces its origins to 1912, when it was formed as a Militia brigade as part of the introduction of the compulsory training scheme, assigned to the 2nd Military District. At this time, the brigade's constituent units were located around Sydney, in New South Wales, with depots located around Darlinghurst, Surry Hills, Pyrmont, Redfern and Darlington.

=== World War I ===
The 7th Brigade was re-formed in early 1915 as part of the First Australian Imperial Force, which was raised for overseas service during World War I. Under the command of Colonel James Burston, it consisted of four infantry battalions raised in Queensland, South Australia and Western Australia—the 25th, 26th, 27th and 28th Battalions—the brigade was assigned to the 2nd Division in July 1915. After being deployed to Egypt, the brigade was sent to the Gallipoli peninsula in September 1915 as reinforcements for the Allied force that had landed there on 25 April, and were attached to the New Zealand and Australian Division, occupying positions north-east of Anzac Cove. The next several months were spent defending the beachhead, until the order to evacuate was given in mid-December, when the entire force was withdrawn from the peninsula.

After the evacuation, the brigade was re-constituted in Egypt, where a further period of training followed. At this time, the AIF was expanded and re-organised. The 7th Brigade returned to the command of the 2nd Division and in March 1916, after a brief period of defensive duties around the Suez Canal, the brigade was among the first Australian troops deployed to the Western Front, sailing in March 1916. For the next two-and-a-half years they would take part in a number of major Australian battles including the Battle of Pozières in July 1916, and Lagnicourt, Passchendaele and Broodseinde in 1917. In 1918, the 7th undertook a defensive role during the German spring offensive, fighting around Villers-Bretonneux. On 10 June, the brigade took part in the Third Battle of Morlancourt, attacking the village of Sailly-Laurette, to the south of Morlancourt. As a result, 325 Germans were taken prisoner, while the Australians lost 400 killed or wounded. In August, the brigade joined the Allied Hundred Days Offensive. After the initial success around Amiens, as the Allies sought to penetrate the Hindenburg Line, the Australian 2nd Division advanced to the Somme River, the 7th Brigade attacked around Biaches, crossing the river around Peronne on 30 August. During the subsequent Battle of Mont St Quentin–Peronne, the 7th Brigade's advanced towards Aizecourt-le-Haut.

In early October 1918, after fighting an action around Grandcourt, the 7th Brigade was withdrawn from the line to reorganise. At this time, the 25th Battalion was disbanded to provide reinforcements to the rest of the brigade, with the majority being sent to the 26th Battalion. They remained out of the line until 7 November, when orders were received to move forward from the rest camp around St Owen. The brigade was in the process of marching towards the front when news that the armistice had been signed reached them.

=== Inter war years ===
Following the end of hostilities, 7th Brigade was disbanded in 1919. In 1921, the decision was made to reorganise the part-time Citizens Military Force to perpetuate the numerical designations and battle honours of the AIF, as well as its divisional structure. As a consequence, 7th Brigade was re-raised on 21 May 1921 under the command of Brigadier James Robertson. Initially the brigade consisted of four infantry battalions, however, during the 1930s a number of the brigade's subordinate units were merged due manpower shortages that resulted from the economic hardships of the Great Depression and the end of the compulsory training scheme in 1929. In 1938, however, attempts were made to increase the size of the Militia due to concerns about the possibility of war in Europe, and as a part of this the 61st Battalion was raised in Brisbane and became part of 7th Brigade.

=== World War II ===
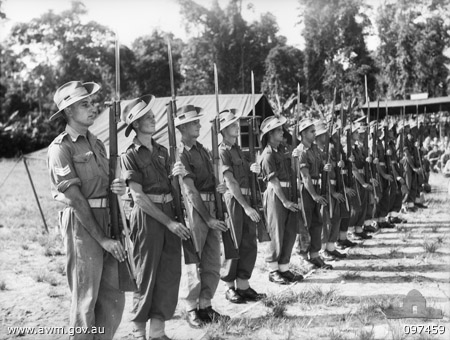
An honour guard drawn from the 7th Brigade and 3rd Division in 1945

During the early part of World War II, the 7th Brigade was a Militia unit made up of several infantry battalions—the 9th, 15th, 25th, 49th and 61st Battalions—which were assigned to the brigade at various times. At the beginning of the war the brigade was primarily responsible for the defence of South East Queensland, with battalions located at Chermside, Cabarlah and Maryborough. On 13 December 1941, the brigade received order to partially mobilise; the following day the order for full mobilisation was issued. The brigade then only had 1,393 men in all ranks. Because of the issue of the mobilisation order, by 27 December, this had increased to 4,449 men of all ranks.

The Australian Army transitioned from the four battalion brigade structure to the three battalion structure favoured by the British during 1940–1941. As a result, the 15th and 47th Battalions were reallocated to the 29th Brigade in February and May 1942, and as a result by May 1942, the 7th Brigade consisted only of the 9th, 25th and 61st Battalions. At this time it relocated to Townsville to act as the city's covering force along with the 11th Brigade and the 29th Brigade. On 9 July 1942, the first elements of the brigade departed Townsville for Milne Bay, arriving there on 11 July embarked in the Dutch ship SS Tasman. In August, the brigade took part in the Battle of Milne Bay along with elements of the 7th Division, during which the Australians struck a considerable blow to Japanese intentions in the Pacific, inflicting upon them their first major defeat on land of the war, turning back an attempted landing to secure the strategically important airfields that the Allies had built in the region.

Following the battle, the brigade maintained a garrison around Milne Bay until March 1943 when they were moved back to Port Moresby. They were reassigned to the 11th Division at this time, and assumed the role of New Guinea Force's reserve brigade. In April, the brigade moved to Donadabu, occupying a position around Sogeri Plateau, where they undertook further training and remained poised to reinforce troops around Wau of Lae, if necessary. In the end, the brigade was not employed in further combat at this time, and following the capture of Lae, in November 1943 the brigade was returned to Australia where it undertook a period of reorganisation and training on the Atherton Tablelands. In mid-1944, the brigade was deployed overseas again, firstly to Madang where it undertook garrison duty and patrolling operations to locate Japanese stragglers, before moving to Hansa Bay in August. This moved was short lived as the brigade was transferred to Bougainville Island later in the year where they took part in the a number of significant battles until the end of the war including the battles of Pearl Ridge and Slater's Knoll. Following the end of hostilities the brigade was disbanded on 8 December 1945.

=== Post World War II ===
In 1948, the Citizens Military Force was re-formed on a voluntary basis, and 7th Brigade was subsequently re-raised at Kelvin Grove in Brisbane, Queensland on 7 May 1948 under the command of Brigadier William Steele. During this time although most of the brigade's key appointments were filled by Regular Army personnel, the majority of brigade's personnel were part-time soldiers who had a limited training obligation and were confined to one evening parade per week, one training weekend per month and one 14-day continuous training camp a year. In 1951, the compulsory training scheme was reintroduced and this saw the brigade's establishment increase. By 1953, the brigade was assigned to Northern Command. In 1957, the compulsory training scheme was reduced in scope, and made selective, and later suspended once more in 1960. At the same time, the Army adopted the Pentropic divisional structure, which saw the formation of a number of state-based regiments, including the Royal Queensland Regiment and a number of the brigade's component units were reorganised and amalgamated.

In late 1964, conscription was reintroduced, albeit in a different form which focused mainly on bolstering the Regular Army to meet commitments in Southeast Asia. The following year, the Pentropic system was abolished and the Army returned to the traditional divisional structure. During the Pentropic years, brigade formations had been discontinued, although their headquarters units had remained in many cases, to improve the flow of information. Following the decision to return to the traditional triangular divisional structure in 1965, the brigade formations were re-adopted, however, in 1967 the designation of "task force" was adopted instead of "brigade", as it was felt that the later term was too "rigid". As a result, the 7th Brigade was known for a time as the "7th Task Force". In 1973, the 7th Task Force was placed under the command of the 1st Division and in 1982 the formation re-adopted the title of "7th Brigade".

In 1997, a widescale reorganisation of the Army was instituted which saw the amalgamation of a number of the brigade's subordinate units as the 6th Brigade was disbanded. As a part of the restructure, the brigade moved towards the establishment of a core of Regular Army units supported by the brigade's Reserve units; the brigade once again adopted the title of "7th Task Force", however, this was once again changed back to "7th Brigade" in 1999. The brigade also underwent a period of capability enhancement between 1997 and 2000 as a number of new equipment platforms were rolled out in an effort to motorise the brigade. These platforms included protected mobility vehicles, night vision equipment, and improved communications equipment.

While the brigade has not deployed as a whole unit since World War II, component units have deployed on operations to East Timor, the Solomon Islands, Iraq and Afghanistan. Throughout 2010 the brigade provided elements to operations in Afghanistan, Iraq and East Timor, with around 2,500 personnel being deployed. On 20 November 2010, the brigade marched through the Brisbane central business district, as the returning soldiers were officially welcomed back to Australia in the biggest welcome home parade since the end of the Vietnam War.

In April 2015, around 100 personnel from the 7th Brigade deployed to Iraq as part of Task Group Taji, to provide training for Iraqi forces fighting against ISIL, alongside troops from various other nations including New Zealand.

== Organisation ==
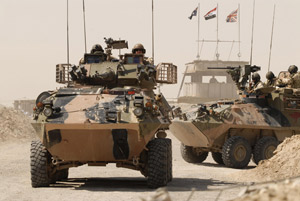
2/14 LHR ASLAVs in Iraq in 2006

Today, the 7th Brigade is converting from an integrated formation containing both Regular Army and Army Reserve units, to a mainly Regular formation, based in Queensland. Under plans announced in 2006, 7th Brigade was expanded by the re-raising of 8th/9th Battalion, Royal Australian Regiment (8/9 RAR), as a Regular motorised infantry battalion. To facilitate this, the two Reserve infantry battalions of the Royal Queensland Regiment were transferred to the 11th Brigade in July 2007.

As of 2023 the brigade consists of:

- Headquarters 7 Brigade
  - 2nd/14th Light Horse Regiment (Queensland Mounted Infantry) – (Armoured Cavalry)
  - 6th Battalion, Royal Australian Regiment – (Mechanised Infantry)
  - 8th/9th Battalion, Royal Australian Regiment – (Motorised Infantry)
  - 1st Regiment, Royal Australian Artillery
  - 2nd Combat Engineer Regiment
  - 7th Combat Signals Regiment (Note: 7CSR was disbanded 31 December 2006. 139th Signals Squadron was re-titled 7CSR again 24 February 2012 at Enoggera.)
  - 7th Combat Service Support Battalion

== See also ==
- Military history of Australia
