= 25th Battalion (Australia) =

- Active: 1915–1919; 1921–1930; 1934–1946; 1948–1960; 1965–1997
- Country: Australia
- Branch: Australian Army
- Type: Infantry
- Size: ~900–1,000 all ranks
- Part of: 7th Brigade, 2nd Division; 3rd Division
- Nickname: The Darling Downs Regiment
- Motto: Vestigia Nulla Retrorsum
- Colours: Black over blue
- Engagements: First World War: Gallipoli campaign; Western Front; Second World War: New Guinea campaign; Bougainville campaign

Insignia
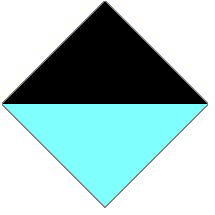
- Unit colour patch

The 25th Battalion was an infantry unit of the Australian Army. Raised in early 1915 as part of the Australian Imperial Force during the First World War, the battalion fought at Gallipoli and in the trenches along the Western Front, before being disbanded in early 1919. In mid-1921, it was re-formed as a part-time unit based in the state of Queensland. Throughout the 1930s, the battalion was merged briefly with the 49th Battalion as a result of manpower shortages, but was later re-raised in its own right. During the Second World War, the 25th deployed to New Guinea where they fought the Battle of Milne Bay in August and September 1942. Later in the war, the 25th took part in the Bougainville Campaign. During the post-war period, the 25th Battalion became part of the Royal Queensland Regiment, variously forming battalion or company-sized elements, before being merged with the 49th Battalion to form the 25th/49th Battalion, Royal Queensland Regiment.

== History ==
=== First World War ===
Formed as part of the Australian Imperial Force for overseas service during the First World War, the 25th Battalion was formed at Enoggera in March 1915 from volunteers from the state of Queensland, and was assigned to the 7th Brigade. It had an authorised strength of 1,023 men. After undertaking a brief period of rudimentary training, under the command of Lieutenant Colonel John Paton, it departed Australia in July. After arriving in Egypt it was assigned to the newly formed Australian 2nd Division, but it was later detached to the New Zealand and Australian Division with whom the 25th Battalion briefly served as reinforcements at Gallipoli in the latter part of the campaign. Arriving in September, the battalion's involvement was limited to mainly defensive operations, and it remained on the peninsula for only a couple of months before the Allied evacuation in December.

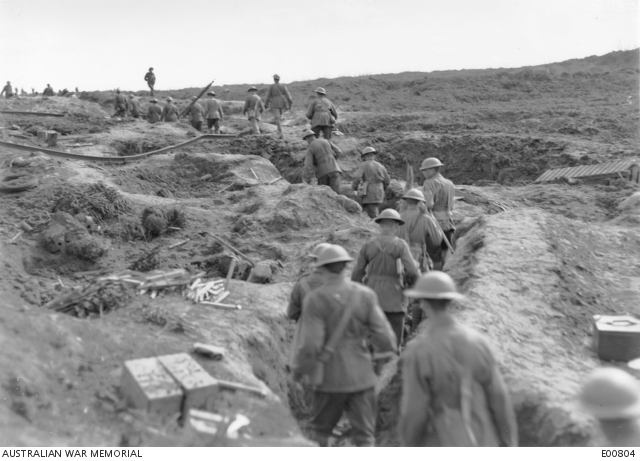
25th Battalion headquarters near Ypres, 21 September 1917.

In early 1916, after returning to Egypt the AIF was reorganised and expanded, and the 25th Battalion was returned to the 2nd Division, with which it subsequently served on the Western Front after being transferred to Europe. Its first significant battle there came at Pozières on 28 July 1916 where the battalion suffered heavily during a night-time attack on the heights, losing 12 officers and 350 other ranks killed or wounded, many of whom were caught in thick wire obstacles that had been left intact by the pre-attack artillery bombardment. A follow-up attack on 4 August added more casualties, bringing the total loss for the 25th in its first battle on the Western Front to 785. After this, the 25th Battalion spent a brief period around Ypres, where they undertook a series of raids, before returning to the Somme in the last part of 1916 where they undertook further attacks throughout November to extend their observation of the Albert–Bapaume Road.

For the next two years it rotated through the line and took part in many more battles in France and Belgium, including the Second Battle of Bullecourt, the Battle of Menin Road, and the Battle of Broodseinde Ridge throughout 1917. After wintering in Belgium, in early 1918 the 25th Battalion moved south to Somme as the Australian divisions were transferred there to help blunt the German spring offensive in March and April, undertaking a defensive action around Villers-Bretonneux as the Allies fought to defend the vital railhead of Amiens. In the lull that followed, minor actions were fought around Morlancourt and Hamel, before the Allies launched their Hundred Days Offensive around Amiens in August. Exhausted by the fighting earlier in the year, its final action came in early October 1918 against the Beaurevoir Line, after which it was disbanded to provide reinforcements to the 26th Battalion with a view to undertaking further operations, but this did not eventuate before the war ended.

According to the Australian War Memorial, the 25th Battalion lost 1,026 killed and 2,821 wounded during the war. These losses represent the highest number of casualties of any Australian battalion that served during the war. It was awarded 17 battle honours for its war service in 1927. Individual awards included six Distinguished Service Orders (DSOs), 19 Military Crosses with three bars, 17 Distinguished Conduct Medals (DCMs), 78 Military Medals (MM) with three bars, four Meritorious Service Medals (MSMs), 18 Mentions in Despatches (MIDs) and five foreign awards.

=== Inter-war years and the Second World War ===
During the inter-war years, Australia's part-time military forces were reorganised in mid-1921 to perpetuate the numerical designations of the AIF, and the 25th Battalion was re-raised as part of the part-time Citizens Force (and then later the Militia), based in the Darling Downs region of Queensland, within the 1st Military District, once again assigned to the 7th Brigade. Territorial designations were introduced in 1927, at which point the battalion adopted the title of the "Darling Downs Regiment" and the motto Vestigia Nulla Retrorsum. In 1930, the 25th and 49th Battalions were amalgamated due to manpower shortages following the end of the compulsory training scheme. They were split again in 1934 and the 25th Battalion was re-raised in its own right.

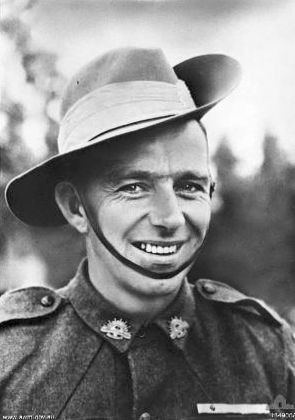
Reg Rattey, who received the 25th Battalion's sole Victoria Cross, for his actions during the Bougainville Campaign in 1945.

Following the outbreak of the Second World War, the 25th Battalion undertook periods of continuous training in the greater Brisbane area as part of efforts to improve the nation's readiness. As the prospect of war in the Pacific grew, this training gained in intensity, and when Japan entered the war in late 1941, the 25th Battalion was mobilised for full-time service. Initially it undertook defensive duty on the coast around Caloundra, but as the Japanese advanced within the Pacific the 25th was moved north to Townsville in May 1942 and then deployed to New Guinea in July.

In August and September 1942, the 25th Battalion took part in the pivotal Battle of Milne Bay, remaining there after repelling the Japanese invasion. They spent the next six months deployed there, before moving back to Port Moresby in March 1943. They returned to Australia in November 1943, reforming on the Atherton Tablelands in early 1944. A period of training followed before the 25th deployed to Madang in New Guinea for further garrison duties. In November, as part of the 3rd Division, the battalion was committed to the Bougainville Campaign where the Australians had taken over from the American forces that had previously been fighting a containment campaign. The 25th Battalion subsequently took part in a number of significant actions as the Australians went on the offensive. These actions included the Battle of Pearl Ridge in December 1944 in the central sector of the island and then the Battle of Slater's Knoll in April after the 7th Brigade was reassigned to the drive south towards the Japanese stronghold in Buin. For his actions during the fighting around Slater's Knoll, one 25th Battalion member, Corporal Reginald Rattey, received the Victoria Cross. After the fighting around Slater's Knoll, the 25th Battalion played no further part in the fighting before the war came to in August as the 7th Brigade was relieved by the 15th.

During the war, the battalion lost 62 men killed in action or died on active service, while another 174 were wounded. Lieutenant Colonel Edward Miles commanded the battalion for the majority of its service, before handing over to Lieutenant Colonel John McKinna who commanded the battalion during the fighting on Bougainville. For its service during the war, the 25th Battalion was awarded eight battle honours in 1961; at the same time it was also entrusted with the battle honours earned by the 2/25th Battalion. Besides Rattey's Victoria Cross, other individual decorations awarded included three DSOs, three MCs, 13 MMs and 16 MIDs.

=== Post-war period ===
At the conclusion of the war, the 25th Battalion was disbanded in 1946 as part of the demobilisation process, but in the post-war period, the 25th Battalion was re-raised in 1948 within the newly formed Citizens Military Force. Once again, the battalion was based on the Darling Downs. In 1960, it became part of the Royal Queensland Regiment, initially forming two companies within the Pentropically organised 1st Battalion, Royal Queensland Regiment, before being formed as a full battalion known as 25 RQR in 1965, when the Pentropic system was abolished. After this, 25 RQR remained in existence until 1997 when it was once again merged with the 49th Battalion, to form the 25th/49th Battalion, Royal Queensland Regiment, following the end of the Ready Reserve Scheme.

== Battle honours ==
The 25th Battalion was awarded the following battle honours:

- First World War: Somme, 1916, '18; Pozières; Bullecourt; Ypres, 1917; Menin Road; Polygon Wood; Broodseinde; Poelcappelle, Passchendaele; Amiens; Albert, 1918; Mont St. Quentin; Hindenburg Line; Beaurevoir; France and Flanders, 1916–18; Gallipoli, 1915; Egypt, 1915–16.
- Second World War: South-West Pacific 1942–1945; Milne Bay; Mawaraka; Mosigetta; Puriata River; Pearl Ridge; Barara; and Slater's Knoll.

In 1961, the battalion – although no longer on the Australian Army's order of battle – was entrusted with the battle honours awarded to the 2/25th Battalion for its service with the 2nd AIF during World War II. The honours it inherited at this time were: North Africa; Syria 1941; Merjayun; Chenim and Rharife; Damour; Mazaraat ech Chouf; South-West Pacific 1942–1945; Kokoda Trail; Ioribaiwa; Eora Creek–Templeton's Crossing II; Oivi–Gorari; Buna–Gona; Gona; Lae–Nadzab; Lae Road; Liberation of Australian New Guinea; Ramu Valley; Shaggy Ridge; Borneo 1945; Balikpapan; Milford Highway.
