= 9th Battalion, Royal Queensland Regiment =

Australian Army infantry battalion

- Cap badge of the Royal Queensland Regiment
- Active: 1867–1919; 1921–1945; 1948–present
- Country: Australia
- Allegiance: Queensland (1867–1901); Australia (1901–present)
- Branch: Queensland Defence Force; Australian Army
- Type: Infantry
- Role: Line infantry (formerly); Light infantry
- Part of: 11th Brigade
- Garrison/HQ: Gallipoli Barracks, Enoggera
- Nicknames: The Guards of Queensland; The Fighting Ninth
- Mottos: Pro Aris et Focis (For God and our Homes)
- Colours: Black over blue
- March: Brass Band – El Abanico; Pipe Band – The Frog Hollow Rangers
- Engagements: Boer War World War I: Gallipoli campaign; Western Front; World War II: New Guinea campaign
- Battle honours: 80 (See below)

Insignia
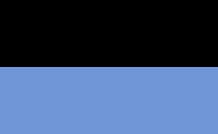
- Unit colour patch

The 9th Battalion, Royal Queensland Regiment (9 RQR) is a Reserve light infantry battalion of the Australian Army, raised and based in the state of Queensland. It is part of the Royal Queensland Regiment and is currently attached to the 11th Brigade of the 2nd Division. 9 RQR can trace its history as far back as 1867 with the establishment Queensland Volunteer Rifle Corps, although it was not until 1911 that it was designated as the "9th Battalion". Over the course of its history, the battalion has served Australia in a number of conflicts including The Boer War, World War I and World War II, while more recently, members of the battalion have been involved in various peacekeeping operations and exercises around the Pacific region.

== History ==
=== Before World War I ===
The 9th Battalion, Royal Queensland Regiment can trace its history as far back as 1867 when, in March, the Fortitude Valley and Spring Hill Volunteer Rifle Corps (usually referred to as the "Frog Hollow Rangers") was formed under the command of Charles Lilley, the future Premier of Queensland. The men of the Volunteer Rifle Corps received no remuneration for their service, instead they received land grants, which were made available following five years service.

In 1876, the Queensland Defence Force Infantry was created, in response to a perceived threat against Imperial defence following the buildup of French and Russian naval vessels in Pacific Ocean. This force consisted of two regiments, which were designated as the First and the Second Regiments of Queensland. The First Regiment was based in Brisbane and consisted of four companies, and over time it came to be known as "The First Queenslanders". The Second Regiment had troops in Ipswich, Maryborough, Rockhampton, Toowoomba and Warwick and also fielded artillery and engineering units.

In 1889, many members of the Queensland Defence Force Infantry deployed to South Africa to take part in the Second Boer War. In total nine contingents, totalling 2,888 men left from Queensland to fight alongside other contingents from the British Empire. Following Federation in 1901 all the state defence forces were combined into the Australian Army, and all senior units were numbered 1 to 12. As a result, The First Queenslanders became the "9th Australian Infantry Regiment" (9 AIR), although this would not last long, for the name was changed once more in 1911, with the introduction of the Universal Training Scheme, when the unit was renamed the "9th Battalion, The Moreton Regiment".

=== World War I ===
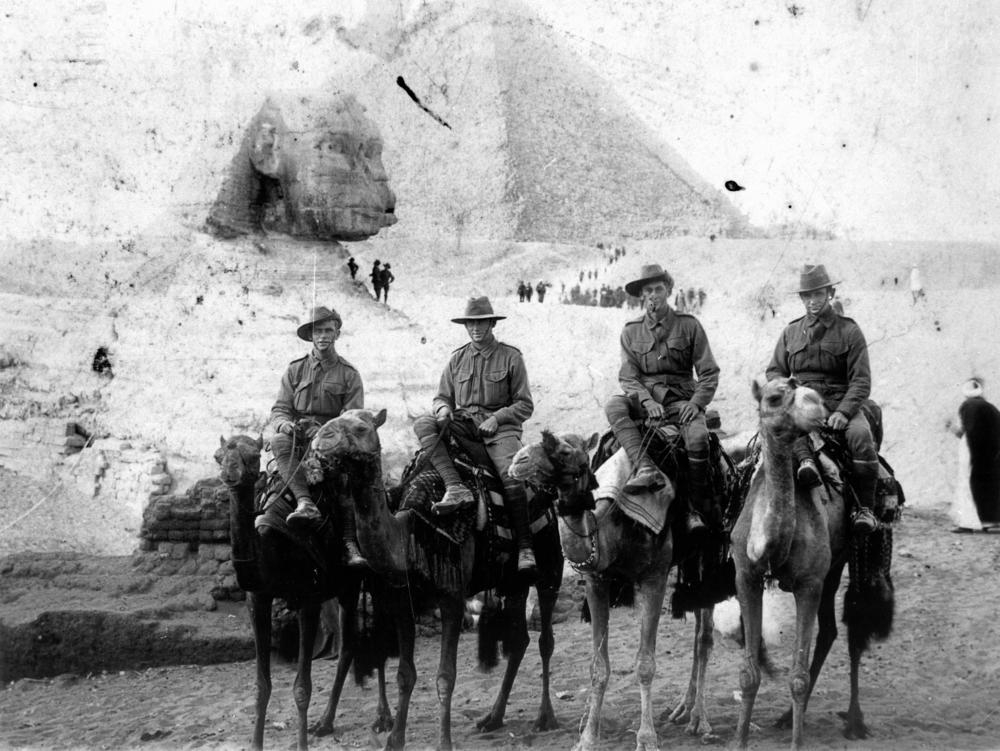
Privates from the 9th Battalion enjoying a camel ride near the Pyramids, Egypt, 1914

The 9th Battalion was raised as part of the all-volunteer First Australian Imperial Force for service in the First World War. Completely recruited from Queensland, along with 10th, 11th and 12th Battalions, the 9th Battalion formed the 3rd Brigade, of the 1st Division. The battalion was formed shortly after the war broke out and after a short period of training, it departed Brisbane on 24 September 1914 on board the transport SS Omrah (HMAT A5). While en route members of the battalion provided a guard for the 44 survivors of the Emden. Initially, they had been bound for the United Kingdom, but concerns about overcrowding in the training camps there meant that the decision was made to land the 1st Division in Egypt, where it would complete its training before being transported to the Western Front.

The 9th Battalion arrived in Egypt on 2 December 1914, after which they undertook a period of intense training before being assigned to the Anglo-French force that was sent to Gallipoli to force a passage through the Dardanelles. Coming ashore early on 25 April 1915 at Anzac Cove, the battalion joined the rest of 3rd Brigade. Lieutenant Duncan Chapman was the first soldier ashore at Gallipoli. The battalion served at Gallipoli until 16 November 1915.

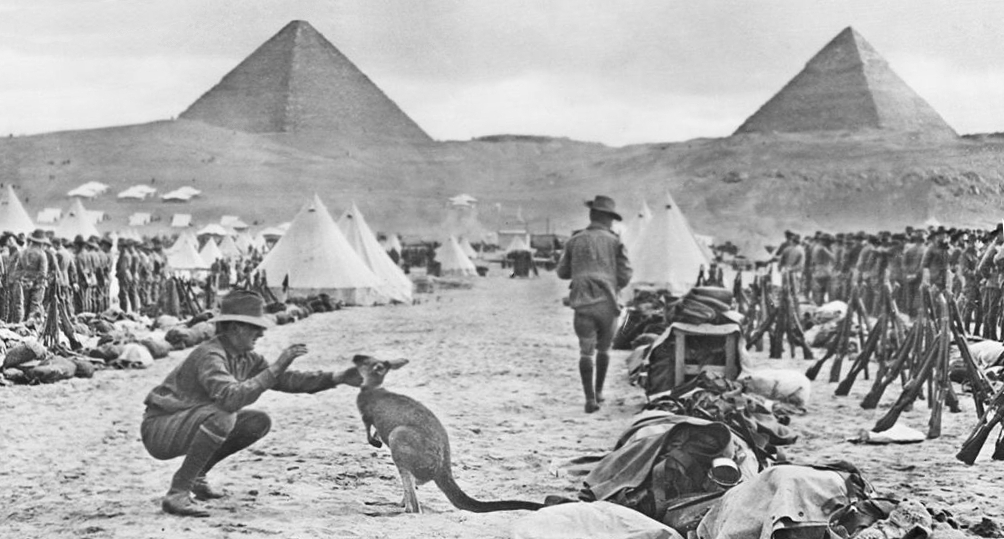
Lines of the 9th and 10th Battalions at Mena Camp, Egypt, looking towards the Pyramids, December 1914. The soldier in the foreground is playing with a kangaroo, the regimental mascot

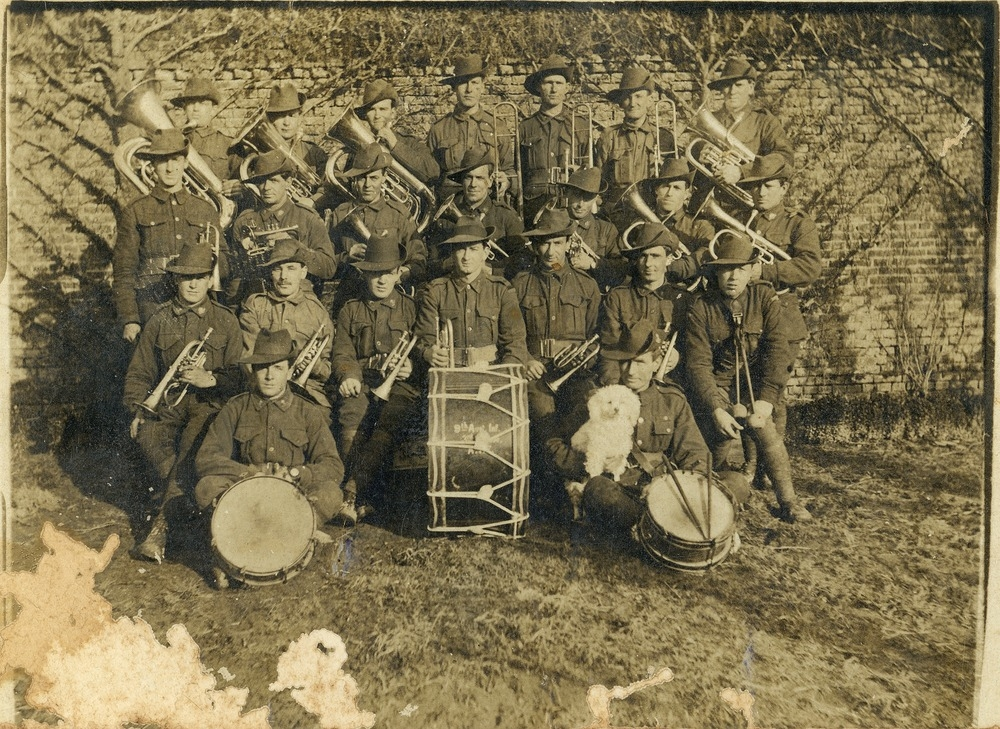
9th Battalion army band in France, 1917

After the withdrawal from Gallipoli, the battalion returned to Egypt where the AIF underwent a period of reorganisation and expansion. As a part of this process, the 9th Battalion provided a cadre of experienced personnel to the newly formed 49th Battalion. In March 1916, the battalion sailed to France as the AIF's infantry divisions were transferred to the Western Front. On arrival, the 9th Battalion deployed to the Somme, experiencing its first major action at Pozières in July 1916, where Private John Leak earned the Victoria Cross. Following this, the 9th Battalion moved to the Ypres sector, in Belgium, before returning to the Somme where they manned the trenches throughout the winter. Throughout most of 1917, the 9th Battalion was engaged in operations against the Hindenberg Line, before participating in the Third Battle of Ypres that autumn.

In early 1918, the capitulation of Tsarist Russia allowed the Germans to concentrate their strength on the Western Front, and they subsequently launched a major offensive in March. As the Allies were forced back, the 9th Battalion undertook a defensive role until the German onslaught was blunted. In August, the Allies launched their own offensive, which ultimately ended the war. In August, the 9th fought around Amiens. It remained in the line until September when the Australian Corps, having suffered heavy casualties throughout 1918, was withdrawn for rest and reorganisation. They took no further part in the fighting before the armistice was signed in November 1918. After the conclusion of hostilities, the demobilisation process began and the battalion's strength slowly fell as its personnel were repatriated back to Australia. On 5 February 1919, the 9th Battalion was amalgamated with the 10th and subsequently disbanded. Throughout the war, the battalion lost 1,094 killed and 2,422 wounded.

=== Between the wars ===
Following the end of World War I the 9th Infantry Regiment (Moreton Regiment) was formed as part of the Citizens Forces, of which the 1st Battalion, 9th Infantry Regiment was formed from the 9th Battalion, AIF, while the 2nd Battalion was formed from the previously existing militia unit known as the 7th Infantry (The Moreton Regiment). In 1919, the Army Council Instruction Number 444 ordered that all Australian Military Forces would in future carry AIF Battle Honours. That same year the Battalion provided a Royal Guard to King George V. In 1921, the 9th Infantry Regiment became the 9th Battalion (Moreton Regiment), following an amalgamation of the 2nd Battalion, 9th Infantry Regiment and the 5th Battalion, 9th Infantry Regiment. In 1930, the Battalion linked with the 15th Battalion (Oxley Regiment), becoming the 9th/15th Battalion until 1934 and then linking with the 49th Battalion, becoming the 9th/49th Battalion until the outbreak of the Second World War.

=== World War II ===
Following Australia's declaration of war in September 1939 the 9th/49th Battalion as it was then known was immediately separated into two independent battalions. The 9th Battalion was placed into the 7th Brigade, as part of the 5th Division. Due to the provisions of the Defence Act, which precluded sending conscripts outside of Australian territory, a Second Australian Imperial Force (2nd AIF) was formed. The battalions of this force were largely drawn out of the militia battalions, and the units of 2nd AIF were distinguished from their militia counterparts by adding a "2/" in front of the numeral that indicated the battalion. The 2/9th Battalion was created from volunteers for overseas service from the 9th Battalion, although the 2/9th was independent from the militia unit, serving as a part of 18th Brigade in North Africa, New Guinea and on Borneo. The 2/9th was disbanded at the end of the war, however, its battle honours live on in 9 RQR.

The 9th Battalion, AMF, as the militia unit became commonly known, performed garrison duty in Australia from 1939 until 1942 when, as part of the 7th Brigade, they moved to the Milne Bay area of New Guinea in response to a perceived threat of a Japanese landing. The battalion was involved in heavy fighting with Japanese forces during the Battle of Milne Bay. From late 1943 to early 1944 the 9th Battalion was in the Donadabu area and later that year moved to Bougainville when the Australians took over from the US garrison there as part of the 3rd Division. After this, it was involved in heavy fighting at Artillery Ridge, Little George Hill, Pearl Ridge, Mosiegetta, and the Hongorai and Puriata Rivers until the Japanese surrender in August 1945. With the end of the war, the 9th Battalion was demobilised on 12 December 1945 having suffered 31 killed and 76 wounded.

=== After World War II ===
The 9th Battalion, The Moreton Regiment, was recreated in 1948 under the Voluntary Training Scheme and in 1954 the battalion again provided a Royal Guard, this time for Queen Elizabeth II. In 1960, when the Australian Army adopted the Pentropic divisional structure, the old regional regimental system was changed to a state based regimental system, the result being the creation of the Royal Queensland Regiment. Initially, all existing Queensland battalions were grouped into the 1st Battalion, based in Southern Queensland and the 2nd Battalion, in Northern Queensland. For five years the 9th Battalion was known as 1 RQR, however, this was changed after it was decided to abandon the use of the Pentropic system and the battalions were reinstated with their original numerals.

In more recent times, members of the Battalion have deployed to East Timor and Bougainville as UN peacekeepers, the Solomon Islands contributing to the RAMSI mission, Iraq on Operation Okra, Afghanistan on Operation Highroad and to RAAF Butterworth on rotation as Rifle Company Butterworth. The battalion is currently headquartered at Enoggera, with companies spread across south-east Queensland.

== Lineage ==
9 RQR's lineage can be traced through the following units:
1867–1879: The Spring Hill and Fortitude Valley Rifle Corps
1879–1885: 1st Queensland (Moreton) Regiment
1885–1903: 1st Queenslanders (The Moreton Regiment)
1903–1912: 9th Australian Infantry Regiment (Moreton Regiment)
1912–1918: 7th Infantry (Moreton Regiment)
1918–1921: 2nd Battalion, 9th Infantry Regiment (The Moreton Regiment)
1921–1930: 9th Battalion (The Moreton Regiment)
1930–1934: 9th/15th Battalion (Moreton and Oxley Regiment)
1934–1940: 9th/49th Battalion (Moreton and Stanley Regiment)
1940–1945: 9th Battalion (The Moreton Regiment)
1948–1960: 9th Battalion (The Moreton Regiment)
1960–1965: 'A' Coy, 1st Battalion, Royal Queensland Regiment
1965–present: 9th Battalion, The Royal Queensland Regiment.

== Battle honours ==
The following list is the battle honours carried by the 9th Battalion, Royal Queensland Regiment:

- The Boer War: South Africa 1899–1902.
- World War I: Somme 1916–18; Pozieres; Baupaume 1917; Bullecourt; Messines 1917; Ypres 1917; Menin Road; Polygon Wood; Broonseinde; Poelcappelle; Passchendaele; Ancre 1918; Villers Bretonneux; Lys; Hazebrouck; Kemmel; Hamel; Amiens; Albert 1918; Mont St Quentin; Hindenburg Line; Epehy; St Quentin Canal; Beaurevoir; France and Flanders 1916–18; Anzac; Landing at Anzac; Defence of Anzac; Suvla; Sari Bair; Gallipoli 1915; Egypt 1915–16.
- World War II: North Africa 1941; Giarabub; Defence of Tobruk; The Salient 1941; Syria 1941; Syrian Frontier; Merjayun; Jezzine; Chehim and Rharife; Damour; Mazraat Ach Chouf; Hill 1069; Badarene; South West Pacific 1942–45; Kokoda Trail; Ioribaiwa; Eora Creek- Templeton's Crossing II; Oivi-Gorara; Buna–Gona; Gona; Cape Endiaadere-Sinemi Creek; Sanananda-Cape Killerton; Milne Bay; Mount Tembu; Tembu Bay; Komistum; Lae-Nadzab; Lae Road; Liberation of Australian New Guinea; Ramu Valley; Shaggy Ridge; Finisterres; Tsimba Ridge; Bonis-Porton; Artillery Hill; Pearl Ridge; Mawaraka; Mosiegetta; Puriata River; Darara; Slaters Knoll; Hongorai River; Mivo Ford; Borneo; Balikpapan; Milford Highway.

== Current structure ==
The 9th Battalion, Royal Queensland Regiment's current structure is as follows:

- Battalion Headquarters: Gallipoli Barracks, Brisbane
- A Company: Caboolture Multi-User Depot, Caboolture
- B Company: Gallipoli Barracks, Brisbane
- D Company: Yandina, Gympie, Maryborough and Bundaberg
- Support Company: Gallipoli Barracks, Brisbane
