= HMAS Warrego (U73) =

Ship of the Royal Australian Navy

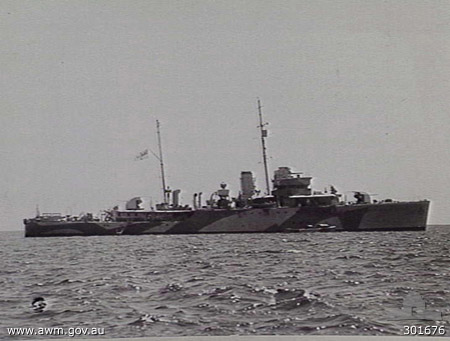

History

Australia
- Namesake: Warrego River
- Builder: Cockatoo Island Dockyard
- Laid down: 10 May 1939
- Launched: 10 February 1940
- Commissioned: 21 August 1940
- Decommissioned: 1966
- Honours and awards: Battle honours: Darwin 1942; Pacific 1941–45; New Guinea 1942; Lingayen Gulf 1945; Borneo 1945; Plus two inherited honours
- Fate: Sold for scrap

General characteristics
- Class & type: Grimsby-class sloop
- Displacement: 1,060 tons (standard), 1,515 tons (full load)
- Length: 266 ft (81 m)
- Beam: 36 ft (11 m)
- Draught: 7 ft 6 in (2.29 m)
- Propulsion: Parsons, steam turbines, 2 shafts. 2,000 shp (1,500 kW)
- Speed: 16.5 knots (30.6 km/h; 19.0 mph)
- Complement: 135
- Armament: 3 × QF 4 in (102 mm) Mk XVI anti-aircraft guns; 4 × QF 3-pounder guns; 1 × machine gun; 2 × Depth charge throwers; 2 × twin tubes for 21 in (533 mm) torpedoes

HMAS Warrego (L73/U73), named for the Warrego River, was a Grimsby-class sloop of the Royal Australian Navy (RAN).

== Construction ==
She was laid down by the Cockatoo Island Dockyard at Sydney on 10 May 1939, launched on 10 February 1940, and commissioned into the RAN on 21 August 1940.

== Operational history ==
Warrego served during World War II as an escort and patrol vessel escorting convoys, including the Pensacola Convoy, in Australian waters and the South-West Pacific. In late January 1942 the ship was assigned to the short lived American-British-Dutch-Australian Command.

The ship was part of the escort, led by USS Houston with the destroyer USS Peary and HMAS Swan, for a convoy composed of USAT Meigs, SS Mauna Loa, Portmar, and MV Tulagi leaving Darwin before two in the morning of 15 February for Koepang carrying troops to reinforce forces already defending Timor. By 11:00, the convoy was being shadowed by a Japanese flying boat that dropped some bombs without causing damage before departing. The next morning another shadowing aircraft had taken position and before noon the convoy was attacked by bombers and flying boats in two waves. After the attacks the convoy continued toward Timor for a few hours with Houston launching a scout plane seeking the enemy position. ABDA suspected the presence of Japanese carriers, an imminent invasion of Timor and a support fleet lying in wait and thus ordered the convoy back to Darwin which it reached before noon on 18 February.

Warrego was in Darwin the next day when the Japanese attacked the port and, though with a working party over the side, was one of the ships that got underway to contribute antiaircraft fire to the defense. The day after the attack, Warrego escorted the damaged Swan through Clarence Strait and then resumed antisubmarine patrol off the port.

Warrego was escorting the Dutch ship Karsik to Townsville when both ships were recalled to Port Moresby in order to form a convoy to bring forces to Milne Bay. With HMAS Ballarat, Warrego escorted Karsik and Dutch ship SS Bontekoe in the first convoy into Milne Bay on 25 June 1942 with Australian troops, American engineers and supplies for the buildup of that base in preparation for port operations and airfield construction. Warrego, disguised with greenery, stood by as Karsik unloaded supplies at an improvised wharf until both sailed for Australia on 28 June. By 11 July, the sloop was back, escorting the Dutch ship SS Tasman with Brigadier John Field and the 7th Brigade Group embarked as Milne Force to protect airfields under construction. By late October Warrego, HMAS Stella, and HMAS Polaris were assisting the survey vessel Paluma in surveying a safe passage for large ships from Milne Bay to Cape Nelson in order to provide large ship support to the Buna campaign that led to Karsik delivering tanks to Buna and the supply convoys of Operation Lilliput.

The ship earned five battle honours for her wartime service: "Darwin 1942", "Pacific 1941–45", "New Guinea 1942", "Lingayen Gulf 1945", and "Borneo 1945".

== Decommissioning and fate ==
Warrego was sold for scrapping in 1966.
