= Operation Cartwheel =

Major Allied military operation in the Pacific theater of World War II

- Part of the Pacific War
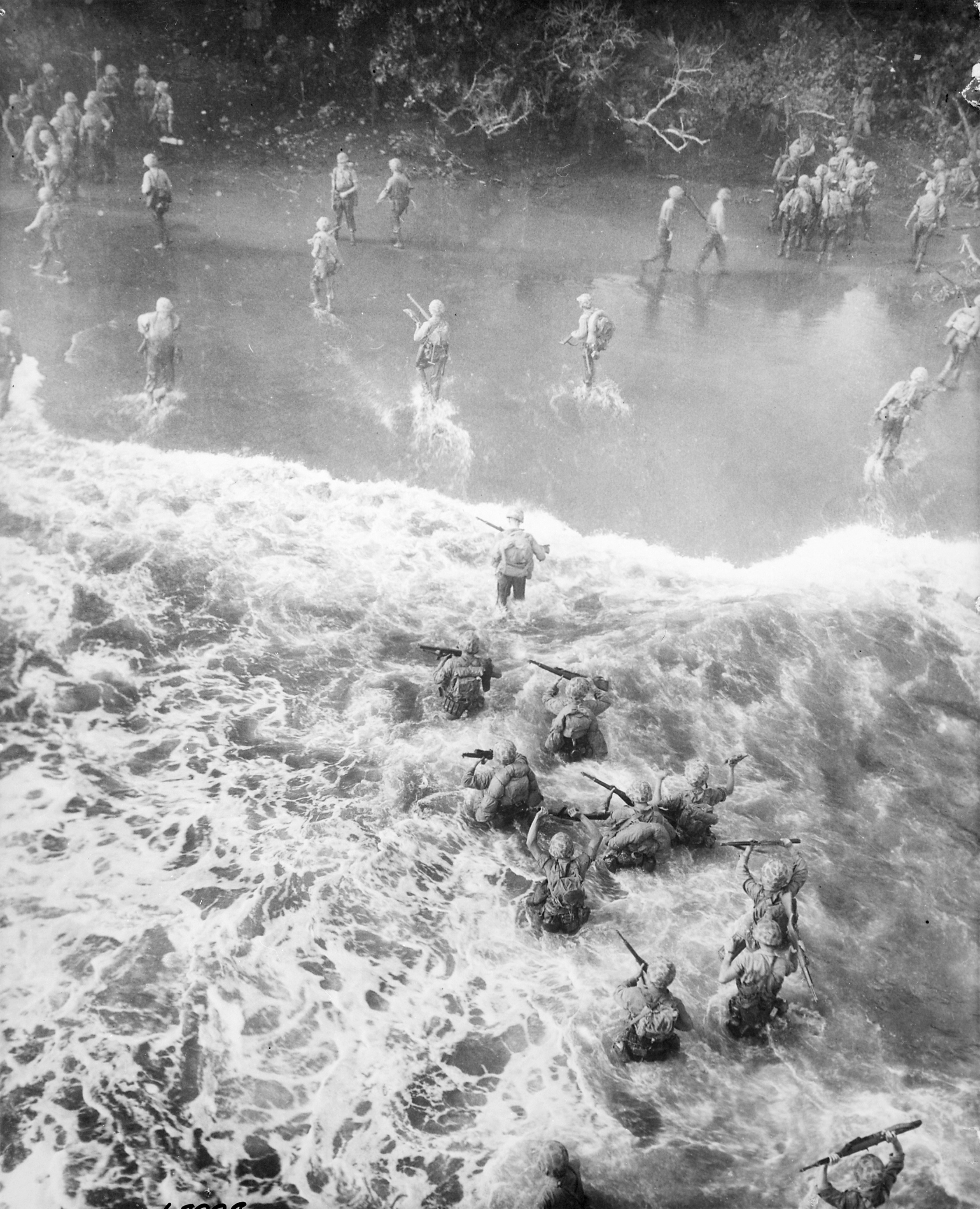
- Men of the 1st Marine Division land ashore during the Battle of Cape Gloucester, 26 December 1943.
Date	30 June 1943 – 20 March 1944 (8 months, 2 weeks and 6 days)
Location	New Guinea and the Solomon Islands
Result	Allied victory

Belligerents
United States; Australia; New Zealand	Empire of Japan

Commanders and leaders
SCSWPA: Douglas MacArthur; First Army: Thomas Blamey; John Lavarack; Edmund Herring; Leslie Morshead; Frank Berryman; Sixth Army: Walter Krueger; Oscar Griswold; Alexander Vandegrift; Roy S. Geiger; Harold Barrowclough; Third Fleet: William F. Halsey; Marc Mitscher; Seventh Fleet: Arthur S. Carpender; Thomas C. Kinkaid; Allied Air Forces: George Kenney; William Bostock	Commander-in-Chief: Hisaichi Terauchi; Combined Fleet: Mineichi Koga; Jinʼichi Kusaka; Ryūnosuke Kusaka; Tomoshige Samejima; Sentarō Ōmori; Eighth Area Army: Hitoshi Imamura; Rimpei Katō; Takeo Itō; 17th Army: Harukichi Hyakutake; Tsutomu Akinaga; 18th Army: Hatazo Adachi; Kane Yoshihara; Air Forces: Kumaichi Teramoto; Giichi Itahana; Einosuke Sudo

Units involved
First Army: I Corps; II Corps; Sixth Army: XIV Corps; I Marine Amphibious Corps; Third Fleet; Seventh Fleet: Task Force 67; Fifth Air Force	Southeast Area Fleet: 8th Fleet; 11th Air Fleet; Eighth Area Army: 17th Army; 18th Army; 38th Division; 4th Air Army: 6th Air Division; 7th Air Division

Strength
250,000	200,000

Casualties and losses
2,000 killed 6,800 wounded	35,300 killed

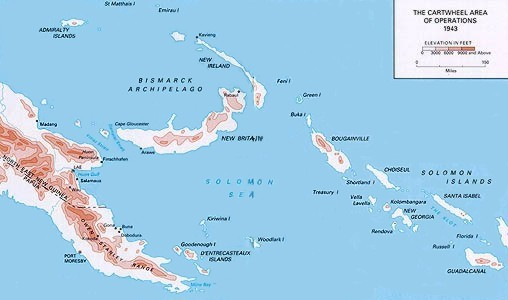
The eastern part of the Territory of New Guinea, and the northern Solomon Islands; the area in which Operation Cartwheel took place, from June 1943.

Operation Cartwheel (1943–1944) was a major military operation undertaken by the Allies in the Pacific theatre of World War II. The ultimate goal of Cartwheel was to neutralize the major Japanese base at Rabaul. The operation was directed by the Supreme Allied Commander in the South West Pacific Area (SWPA), General Douglas MacArthur, whose forces had advanced along the northeast coast of New Guinea and occupied nearby islands. US forces from the South Pacific Area, under Admiral William Halsey, advanced through the Solomon Islands toward Bougainville. Allied forces from Australia, the Netherlands, New Zealand, and various Pacific Islands took part in the operation.

== Background ==
Japanese forces had captured Rabaul, on the island of New Britain in the Territory of New Guinea, from Australian forces in February 1942. Rabaul became a major forward base for Japanese forces in the South Pacific, and in turn became the main objective for Allied forces in the area. MacArthur formulated a strategy known as the Elkton Plan to capture Rabaul, using bases in Australia and New Guinea as staging points. Meanwhile, Admiral Ernest J. King, the Chief of Naval Operations, proposed a plan with similar elements but under US Navy command. Army Chief of Staff George C. Marshall, whose main goal was for the US to concentrate its efforts against Nazi Germany in Europe and not against the Japanese in the Pacific, proposed a compromise in which the drive towards Rabaul would be divided into three stages; the first under Navy command, and the latter two under MacArthur's direction and the control of the Army. This strategic plan, which was never formally adopted by the US Joint Chiefs of Staff but was ultimately implemented in practice, called for the following:

- Capturing Tulagi (and later Guadalcanal) and the Santa Cruz Islands (Operation Watchtower)
- Capturing the northeastern coast of New Guinea and the central Solomons
- Reducing Rabaul and surrounding Japanese bases

The protracted battle for Guadalcanal, followed by the unopposed seizure of the Russell Islands (Operation Cleanslate) on 21 February 1943, resulted in Japanese attempts to reinforce the area by sea. MacArthur's air forces countered in the Battle of the Bismarck Sea from 2–5 March 1943. The disastrous losses suffered by the Japanese prompted Admiral Isoroku Yamamoto to initiate Operation I-Go, a protracted series of air attacks against Allied airfields and shipping at both Guadalcanal and New Guinea, during which Japanese naval air strength was significantly attrited. Yamamoto was killed on 18 April 1943 when his plane was shot down over the Solomon Islands.

== Implementation ==
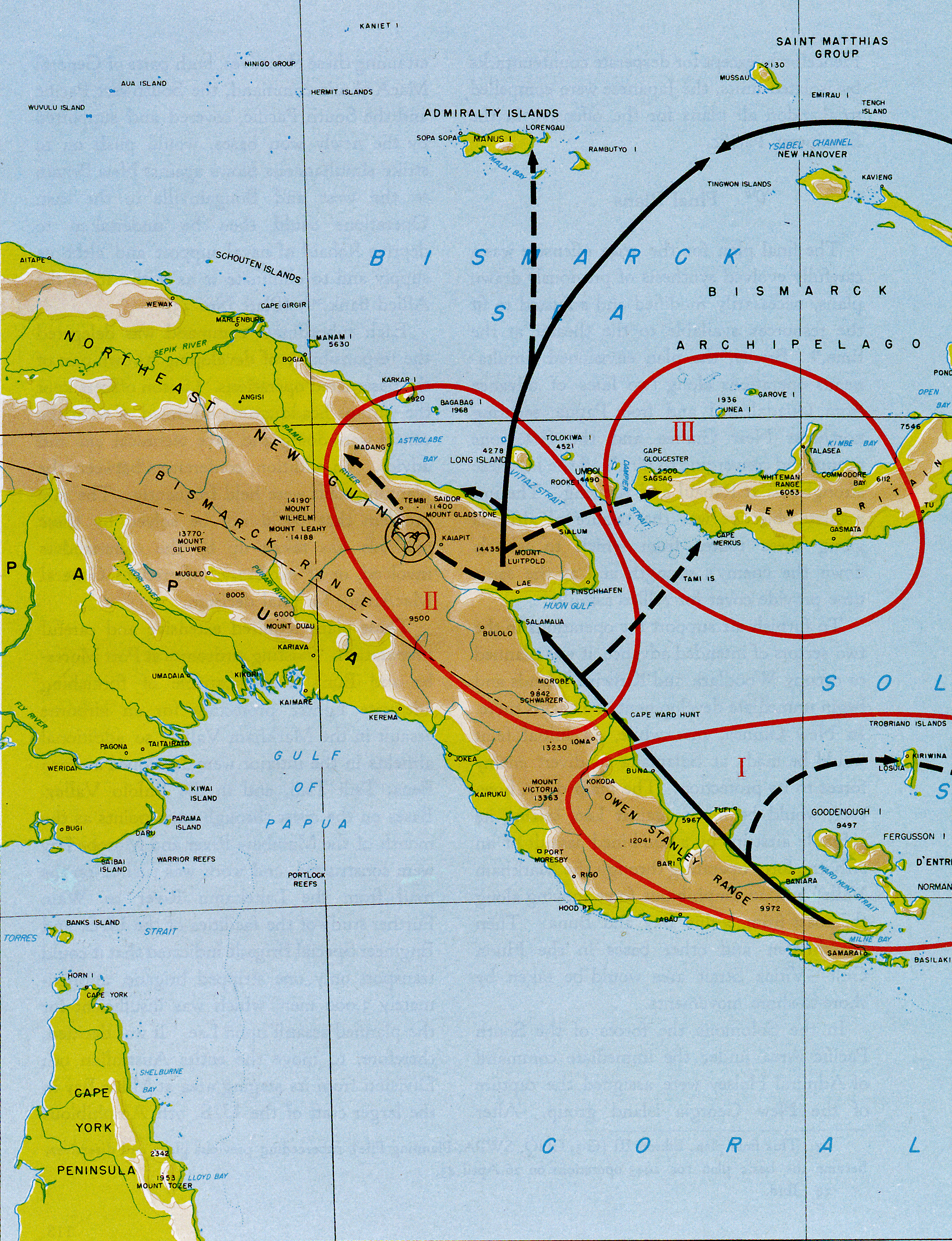
Elkton III Plan, March 1943.

On 12 February 1943 MacArthur presented Elkton III, his revised plan for seizing Rabaul before 1944. It called for the US Army forces under his command to advance on northeastern New Guinea and western New Britain, and for Admiral William F. Halsey Jr., commander of the South Pacific Area, to attack the central Solomon Islands. The plan required seven more divisions than were already in the theatre, which raised objections from the British. The US Joint Chiefs responded with a directive that approved the plan if forces already in the theatre or en route were used, and implementation of the plan was delayed by 60 days. Elkton III then became Operation Cartwheel.

== Operations ==
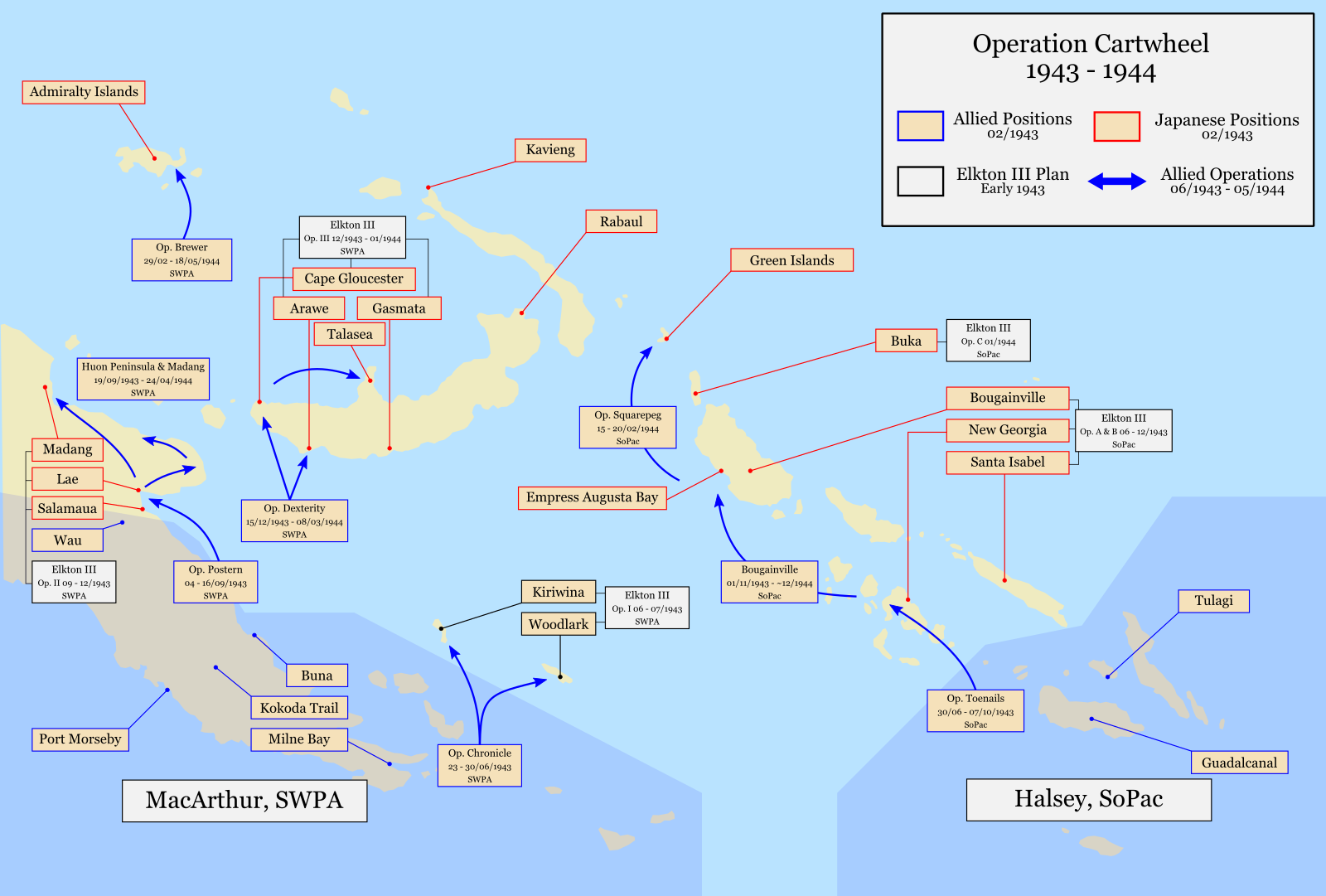
Map of the numerous amphibious operations during Operation Cartwheel

Cartwheel identified 13 proposed subordinate operations and set a timetable for their launching. Of the thirteen, Rabaul, Kavieng, and Kolombangara were eventually dismissed as too costly or unnecessary; only 11 were actually undertaken (whereas the Green Islands, only 117 miles from Rabaul, were substituted for Kavieng).

The New Guinea Force, under General Thomas Blamey, was tasked with thrusting eastward on mainland New Guinea. The US 6th Army, under General Walter Krueger, was ordered to seize Kiriwina, Woodlark, and Cape Gloucester. These land forces would be supported by Allied air units under Lieutenant General George Kenney and naval units under Vice Admiral Arthur S. Carpender.

In the midst of Operation Cartwheel, the Joint Chiefs met with President Franklin Roosevelt and British Prime Minister Winston Churchill at the Quadrant Conference in Quebec City in August 1943. There, the decision was made to bypass and isolate Rabaul rather than attempting to capture the base, now garrisoned by tens of thousands of Japanese troops. Soon afterward, the decision was made to bypass Kavieng as well. Although initially objected to by MacArthur, bypassing Rabaul instead of neutralizing it meant that his Elkton plan had been functionally achieved. After invading Saidor MacArthur moved on to his Reno Plan, an advance across the north coast of New Guinea to Mindanao. This campaign, which stretched into 1944, showed the effectiveness of major Japanese force concentrations in favor of severing Japanese lines of supply and communication to more isolated island garrisons.

=== Operation Chronicle ===
The first campaign of Cartwheel was Operation Chronicle, carried out on 23-30 June 1943. The operation saw units of the 112th Cavalry Regiment and 158th Infantry Regiment land unopposed on Woodlark and Kiriwina Islands, respectively. Planned and carried out by Sixth Army commander Lieutenant General Walter Krueger, the intent of the operation was to construct airfields on Woodlark and Kiriwina where additional troops and supplies could be landed.

=== New Georgia campaign ===
The island of New Georgia was defended by 10,500 Japanese troops and was seen as especially vital by the Allies due to the presence of an airfield at Munda Point. Admiral Halsey assigned Rear Admiral Richmond K. Turner's III Amphibious Force to carry out the initial phases of the campaign. Detachments of the 4th Marine Raider Battalion landed on Segi on 21 June, before the campaign commenced in full on 30 June, when detachments of the 43rd Infantry Division under Major General John H. Hester landed at Viru, Wickham Anchorage, and Rendova. Further landings followed at Zanana on 2 July and Bairoko on 5 July, after which Hester began the advance against Munda Point.

Heat, rain, foliage, and Japanese resistance under Major General Minoru Sasaki slowed the Allied advance significantly. Eventually, the American 35th and 25th Infantry Divisions under Major General Oscar Griswold’s XIV Corps took control of the operation. On 25 July Griswold launched a major offensive against Munda Point, leading to heavy casualties. Eventually, the Japanese decided to withdraw from New Georgia and on 5 August the 43rd Division captured Munda Airfield. Allied casualties throughout the campaign were significantly higher than anticipated, with 1,094 dead and 3,873 wounded, while the Japanese lost 2,483 men. Additionally, the Japanese lost five destroyers and a light cruiser during the campaign, while Turner’s fleet lost a light cruiser and a destroyer.

=== Vella Lavella ===
After evacuating from New Georgia, Sasaki’s forces retreated to the islands of Arundel, Baanga, and Kolombangara. Arundel Island was captured by the 43rd Division by 27 August, though Halsey decided not to attack Kolombangara, deciding instead to capture the nearby island of Vella Lavella, which commenced on 15 August and was carried out primarily by the American 25th and New Zealand 3rd Divisions. Fighting continued for nearly two months until the island was fully in Allied hands, rendering the base on Kolombangara useless and forcing the Japanese to retreat its forces there to Bougainville; Allied naval forces unsuccessfully attempted to intercept the retreating Japanese fleet during a battle on 6 October.

=== Operation Postern ===
Operation Postern was the codename for the final stage of the Salamaua–Lae campaign, and was primarily undertaken by American and Australian troops. The operation commenced on 4 September when forces of the Australian 9th Division under Major General George Wootten, supported by U.S. Vice Admiral Daniel E. Barbey's VII Amphibious Force, landed at Lae. The following day, the U.S. Army’s 503rd Parachute Infantry Regiment captured Nadzab Airport from the Japanese, an operation that was overseen personally by Generals MacArthur and Kenney. By 7 September, the Australian 7th and 9th Divisions had arrived on Lae, defeating the Japanese 41st and 51st Divisions and forcing General Adachi to abandon the port.

=== Bougainville Campaign ===
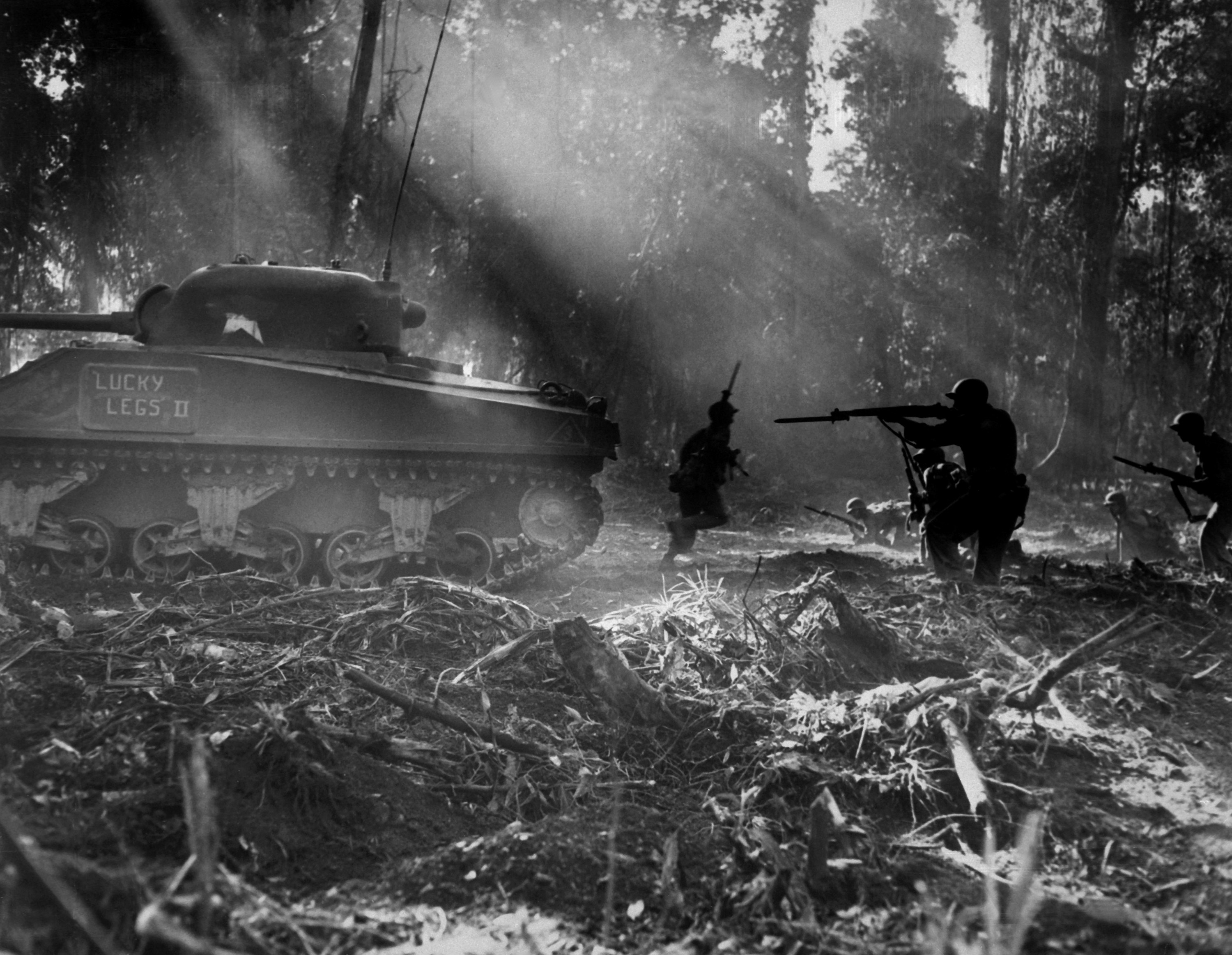
US soldiers fighting during the Bougainville campaign, taken March 1944

With the end of the New Georgia campaign, Japanese forces retreated to the island of Bougainville; Admiral Halsey decided to seize the island in order to use it as a base for bombing attacks on Rabaul. Beginning in early October 1943, Brigadier General Nathan F. Twining’s AirSols force bombed Japanese air bases on Bougainville ahead of the invasion. On 27 October, the New Zealand 8th Brigade captured the Treasury Islands in Operation Goodtime, while the U.S. 2nd Marine Parachute Battalion seized Choiseul Island the following day, in Operation Blissful.

The invasion of Bougainville proper commenced on 1 November. The 3rd Marine Amphibious Corps, commanded by Lieutenant General Alexander Vandegrift, landed 14,000 men at Cape Torokina. Japanese counterattacks that night and the following day were successfully repelled. Throughout the month of November, attempts by the Japanese to reinforce Lieutenant General Harukichi Hyakutake's 17th Army were foiled by detachments of the U.S. Seventh Fleet under Rear Admiral Theodore S. Wilkinson. The 3rd Amphibious Corps, eventually reinforced by the U.S. Army’s 37th Division, continued to endure Japanese bombing, shelling, and counterattacks. By December, the 3rd Amphibious Corps was relieved by the Americal Division under Brigadier General John R. Hodge, and by mid-December three airfields had been constructed on Bougainville by the Allies.

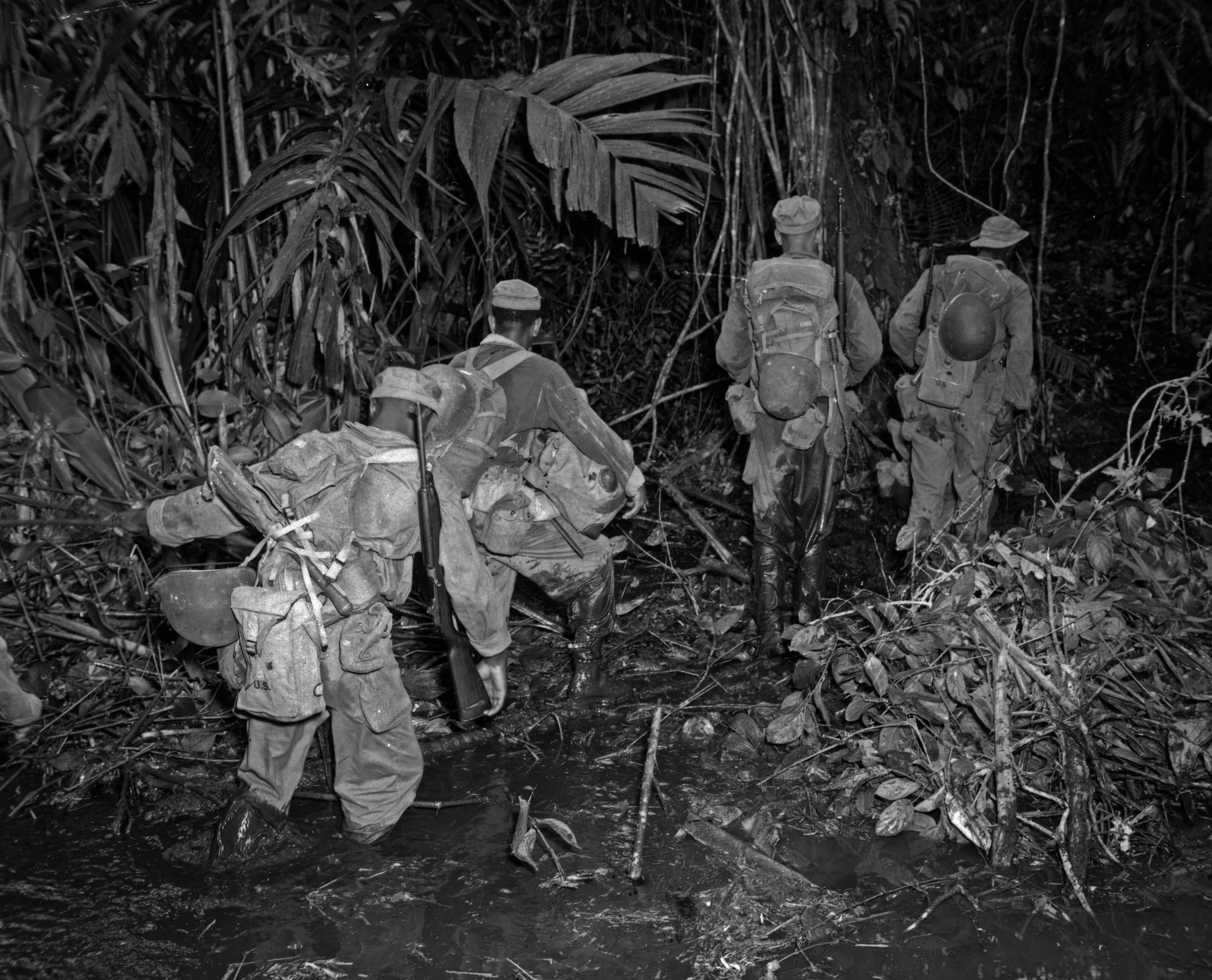
Colored troops of the 93rd Infantry Division during the East-West trail, 15 April 1944

On 15 December, Major General Griswold’s XIV Corps took command of operations on Bougainville. By March of 1944, Hyakutake had amassed 15,000 troops for a counterattack, which commenced on 8 March and dragged on for two weeks before being repelled by Griswold’s forces. The counterattack saw 263 Allied casualties and 10,000 Japanese casualties. The Allies had largely secured Bougainville by April 1944, though fighting on the island continued until the end of the war.

=== Operation Dexterity ===
In August 1943 it was decided by the Allies that Rabaul was too fortified to capture by amphibious assault. Ultimately, MacArthur decided to have Krueger’s Sixth Army invade the western half of New Britain Island. This invasion, codenamed Dexterity, commenced on 15 December when Vice Admiral Barbey’s Task Force 76 landed the 112th Cavalry Regiment on Arawe peninsula. On 26 December, the 1st Marine Division landed at Cape Gloucester to capture two airfields, and engaged the Japanese 17th Division. On 2 January, the 32nd Infantry Division, which had gained infamy for its poor performance during the Battle of Buna–Gona, invaded Saidor. While the initial invasion was unopposed, 40 Americans and nearly 2,600 Japanese were killed by the end of the campaign on 10 February 1944.

=== Nissan Island ===
Halsey’s next objective was the securing of Nissan Island, also known as Green Island, in order to construct a new Allied base. The invasion was preceded on 30 January 1944 by a brief reconnaissance landing by the New Zealand 30th Infantry Battalion, before the invasion commenced in full on 15 February, when detachments of Major General Harold Barrowclough’s 3rd New Zealand Division invaded Nissan and the surrounding islands. During the battle, all Japanese soldiers stationed on the island were killed, and Nissan island was secured within only five days of fighting.

=== Admiralty Islands ===
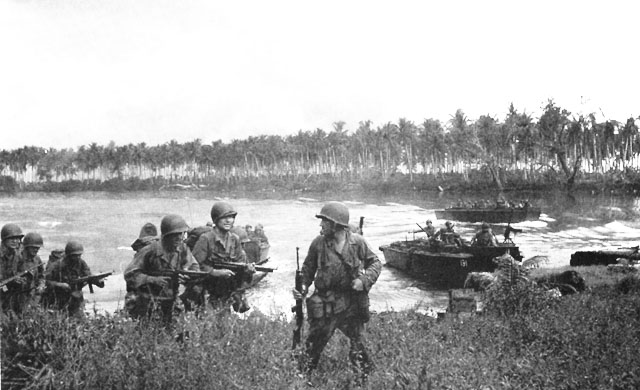
The first wave of US troops lands on Los Negros, Admiralty Islands, 29 February 1944

The Admiralty Islands campaign, also known as Operation Brewer, concentrated primarily on wiping out the Japanese garrison on Manus Island in order to seize the airfields at Momote and Lorengau. On 29 February 1944, units of the 1st Cavalry Division headed by Brigadier General William C. Chase landed at Hyane Harbor on Los Negros Island, seizing the beaches within four hours and capturing Momote airfield. General MacArthur personally observed the battle, and decorated several soldiers on the beach after it was cleared. Further reinforcements from the 7th Cavalry Regiment and 12th Regimental Combat Team arrived in Los Negros on 4-5 March. Brigadier General Verne D. Mudge’s 2nd Cavalry Regiment landed on Manus Island proper at Lugos Mission on 15 March, and within two days had secured Lorengau airfield, while the 7th Cavalry Regiment captured Hauwei. Overall, 326 Allied troops and 3,280 Japanese troops were killed during the campaign.

=== Emirau ===
The final campaign of Cartwheel prior to the neutralisation of Rabaul was the Allied invasion of Emirau. Initially, General MacArthur had wanted to invade the island of Kavieng, but this was ultimately decided against as the island was too heavily fortified by Japanese troops and an invasion would have been considered too costly. It was instead decided to construct an additional airbase on the island of Emirau, where no Japanese troops were stationed. Admiral Halsey ordered a naval bombardment of Kavieng, which commenced on 20 March; at the same time, the 4th Marines landed on Emirau unopposed, and had secured the island within a week.

=== Neutralisation of Rabaul ===
The Japanese Navy attempted to bolster Rabaul's defenses by requisitioning hundreds of carrier aircraft from Japanese carriers based at Truk in December 1943. This proved to be a costly strategic miscalculation, as Allied planes shot down between 200–300 Japanese carrier aircraft during raids on Rabaul, stripping Japan of irreplaceable veteran carrier pilots. Japan's highly selective pilot training program was unable to cope with the casualties incurred from mid-1942 until early 1944, including during Operation Cartwheel, and could not produce enough trained aircrew to replace mounting losses. The result was a gradual degradation of the IJN's existing naval aviation arm, a trend that contributed to the catastrophic Japanese naval defeat at the Battle of the Philippine Sea in June 1944.

The erosion of Japanese strength in the Solomons led directly to the Admiralty Islands campaign, which was carried out in late February 1944, after the Allies had confirmed that the Japanese air threat from Rabaul had been effectively neutralized.

From February 1944 onwards, the Japanese declined to provision Rabaul with fighters or bombers for the rest of the war, mostly due to non-stop bombing of the base by land-based Allied airplanes only a few hundred miles away. The Japanese evacuated 120 aircraft to Truk on 19 February in an attempt to replace carrier aircraft destroyed defending Rabaul. The Japanese attempted to evacuate valuable aircraft mechanics by sea on 21 February, but their transport ship, the Kokai Maru, was sunk by Allied bombers. The Japanese garrison at Rabaul became completely isolated, as their supplies dwindled and Allied domination of the seas and skies rendered reinforcement impossible. Some 70,000 Japanese troops remained trapped at Rabaul by the time Japan surrendered in August 1945.

== See also ==
- Structure of the Imperial Japanese forces in the South Seas Mandate, details on Japanese forces in bypassed islands

== Sources ==
- Frank, Richard B (2000). "Chapter 1, Strategy, Command and the Solomons". Guadlacanal: The Definitive Account of the Landmark Battle. New York: Random House. ISBN 0-394-58875-4.
- Griffith, Brig. Gen. Samuel B (USMC) (1974). "Part 96: Battle For the Solomons". History of the Second World War. Hicksville, New York: BPC Publishing.
- Bergerud, Eric M. (2000). Fire in the Sky: The Air War in the South Pacific. Boulder, Colorado: Westview Press. ISBN 0-8133-3869-7.
- Birdsall, Steve (1977). Flying buccaneers: The illustrated story of Kenney's Fifth Air Force. Doubleday. ISBN 0-385-03218-8.
- Boyington, Gregory "Pappy" (1977) [1958]. Baa Baa Black Sheep. New York: Bantam Books. ISBN 0-553-26350-1.
- Gamble, Bruce (2000). Black Sheep One: The Life of Gregory "Pappy" Boyington. New York: Ballantine Books. ISBN 0-89141-801-6.
- Hara, Tameichi (1978) [1961]. Japanese Destroyer Captain. New York & Toronto: Ballantine Books. ISBN 0-345-27894-1.
- Henebry, John P. (2002). The Grim Reapers at Work in the Pacific Theater: The Third Attack Group of the U.S. Fifth Air Force. Pictorial Histories Publishing Company. ISBN 1-57510-093-2.
- McAulay, Lex (1987). Into the Dragon's Jaws/the Fifth Air Force over Rabaul, 1943. Champlin Fighter Museum Pr. ISBN 0-912173-13-0.
- McGee, William L. (2002). The Solomons Campaigns, 1942-1943: From Guadalcanal to Bougainville--Pacific War Turning Point, Volume 2 (Amphibious Operations in the South Pacific in WWII). BMC Publications. ISBN 0-9701678-7-3.
- Morison, Samuel Eliot (2001) [1958]. Breaking the Bismarcks Barrier. History of United States Naval Operations in World War II. Castle Books. ISBN 0-7858-1307-1.
- Sakaida, Henry (1996). The Siege of Rabaul. St. Paul, Minnesota: Phalanx. ISBN 1-883809-09-6.

=== Official histories ===
Australia

- The New Guinea Offensives (Army)
- Royal Australian Navy, 1942–1945
- Air War Against Japan, 1943–1945 (RAAF)

New Zealand

- The Pacific

United States

- Miller, John Jr. (1959). "CARTWHEEL: The Reduction of Rabaul". United States Army in World War II: The War in the Pacific. Office of the Chief of Military History, US Department of the Army. p. 418.
- Shaw, Henry I.; Douglas T. Kane (1963). "Volume II: Isolation of Rabaul". History of US Marine Corps Operations in World War II.
- Craven, Wesley Frank; James Lea Cate. "Vol. IV, The Pacific: Guadalcanal to Saipan, August 1942 to July 1944". The Army Air Forces in World War II. US Office of Air Force History.
