= Battle of Slater's Knoll =

1945 battle between Australia and Japan

- Part of the Bougainville Campaign of the Pacific Theater (World War II)
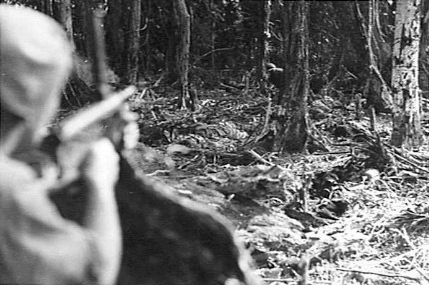
- The view forward from Australian positions on Slater's Knoll, Bougainville, 5 April 1945
| Date | 28 March – 6 April 1945 |
| Location | Bougainville, New Guinea 06°37′12″S 155°18′36″E |
| Result | Australian victory |

Belligerents
| Australia | Imperial Japan |

Commanders and leaders
| (Australia) John Field (Australia) John McKinna | (Empire of Japan) Masatane Kanda (Empire of Japan) Tsutomu Akinaga |

Units involved
| 7th Brigade | 6th Division |

Strength
| 1 brigade | 1 division |

Casualties and losses
| 189 killed and wounded | 620 killed 1,000 wounded 4 captured |

The Battle of Slater's Knoll (28 March – 6 April 1945) was fought between Australian and Japanese forces on Bougainville Island during the Second World War. Part of the Bougainville campaign, the battle occurred as a force of about 3,300 Japanese from the Japanese 6th Division, including artillery and other supporting elements, launched a counterattack against the main Australian offensive which had been pushing south towards Buin, concentrating their attacks on Slater's Knoll near the Puriata River. The Australian troops belonged to the 7th Brigade, with the 25th Infantry Battalion being the most heavily engaged, although the 9th Infantry Battalion and the 61st Infantry Battalion also took part in the fighting.

Against Japanese tactics that included massed attacks, the Australians utilised armour and artillery, and in the end these proved decisive. Commencing in late March, after the Australian advance had been halted by wet weather, over the course of several days the Japanese launched several probing raids followed by heavy attacks against the Australians. The final assault on the knoll came on the night of 4/5 April when 129 men from 'B' Company, 25th Infantry Battalion repulsed an attack by a force of about 1,100 Japanese, killing 292. This proved to be the 7th Brigade's final involvement in the campaign as they were relieved by the 15th Brigade shortly afterwards. Overall, 620 Japanese were killed in the battle with another 1,000 estimated to have been wounded, while the Australians suffered 189 casualties.

== Background ==
At the beginning of 1945, the south-eastern part of Bougainville was occupied by the Japanese 6th Division, under the command of Lieutenant General Tsutomu Akinaga. (Note: Akinaga, formerly chief of staff of the XVII Army, took over command of the division from Lieutenant General Masatane Kanda when Kanda was promoted to take over XVII Army.) Made up of the 13th and 23rd Infantry Regiments—600 and 700-strong respectively—as well as the 6th Field Artillery Regiment, the 6th Engineer Regiment, the 6th Transport Regiment and the 4th Field Heavy Artillery Regiment, Akinaga's division consisted of 3,300 men. (Note: The Australian estimate of this force was between 2,400 and 2,700 men.)

The previous November, the Australian II Corps under Lieutenant General Stanley Savige had taken over responsibility of the island from the US XIV Corps, who had been transferred to fight in the Philippines. Although incorrect, at the time the Allies believed that the Japanese forces on the island numbered around 17,500 men (Note: Allied intelligence reports and estimates on this matter varied greatly and indeed after the war it was found that there had been more than 40,000 Japanese on the island at the time.) and while these forces were understrength, they were still considered to be capable of carrying out effective combat operations. In order to counter this, it was decided that the Australian II Corps—consisting of Militia and Australian Imperial Force troops from the 3rd Division and the 11th and 23rd Brigades (Note: Also attached to the Australian corps were two field artillery regiments, the 2nd and 4th Field Regiments, a company from the 1st New Guinea Infantry Battalion, the 2/8th Commando Squadron, and a squadron of Matilda II tanks from 2/4th Armoured Regiment.)—would go on the offensive and a three-pronged campaign was planned in the northern, central and southern sectors of the island.

As a result, the Australian campaign on the island developed into three separate drives: in the north, it was planned that Japanese forces would be forced into the narrow Bonis Peninsula and contained; in the centre, the seizure of Pearl Ridge would give the Australians control of the east–west thoroughfares and protection against further counterattacks, while also opening the way for a drive to the east coast; and the main campaign would take place in the south, where the bulk of the Japanese forces were concentrated. Consequently, on 21 January, Savige directed the 3rd Division under Major General William Bridgeford to take "swift and vigorous action" to destroy Japanese forces in southern Bougainville. The division's immediate task was to advance south to the Puriata, (Note: The Japanese name for this river was "Priaka".) and send patrols across it. Savige considered that the Japanese division was "weak and off balance" due to casualties and disease as well as a shortage of supplies. Brigadier Raymond Monaghan's 29th Brigade had opened the campaign in the south in mid-December, crossing the Jaba River, before conducting a series of landings by barge along the coast of Empress Augusta Bay, outflanking the Tuju, Tavera, Adele and Hupai Rivers, in what became dubbed the "Battle of the Swamps" by the Australians. The fighting during this time resulted in 240 Japanese killed, and 148 Australian casualties. Monaghan was also relieved of his command.

In late January, the 7th Brigade, under Brigadier John Field, which had been patrolling the Jaba River to protect the 29th Brigade's rear while they pushed south, was subsequently tasked to "take Mosigetta, clear the enemy from the Kupon–Nigitan–Sisiruai area, and patrol along the Puriata". Each of the brigade's three infantry battalions was marginally below full strength at the time, with frontages of between 600 and 700 personnel around the start of the battle.

== Prelude ==
In late January, a company from the Australian 25th Infantry Battalion—under Lieutenant Colonel John McKinna—subsequently carried out an amphibious landing south of Motupena Point, on the Solomon Sea coast and had cleared towards Matsunkei. On 2 February, the battalion carried out another landing at Toko, and advanced northeast from there towards Batara, and then along the west bank of the Puriata, towards the Buin Road. (Note: The Japanese name for the Buin Road was "A Road".) Meanwhile, further to the east, the 9th Infantry Battalion was moved by truck from Torokina to the Jaba River and then moved by barge along the Empress Augusta Bay coast, landing at Mawaraka from where they advanced towards Mosigetta, and the 61st Infantry Battalion also proceeded towards there, setting off from the junction of the Jaba and Pagana Rivers while the 2/8th Commando Squadron provided flank security further to the east. Elements of the 1st New Guinea Infantry Battalion also conducted a landing on the coast, on the 25th Battalion's left flank, to the north of Toko, and advanced to Makaku and then towards Mosigetta.

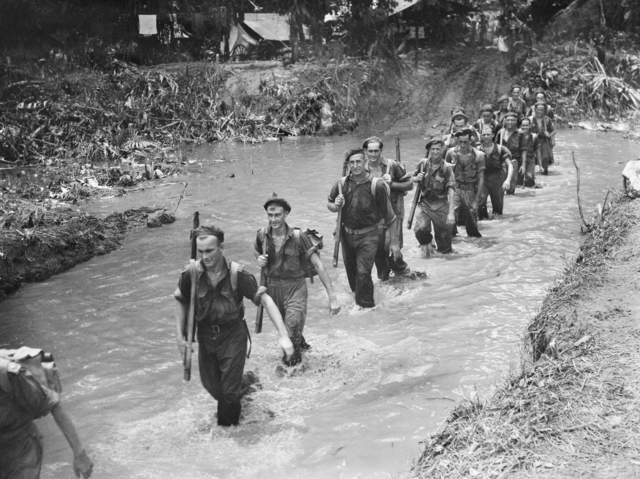
Men from the 61st Infantry Battalion patrol along the Mosigetta River on Bougainville in March 1945 in the lead up to the Battle of Slater's Knoll.

On 4 March, a company from the 25th Infantry Battalion crossed the Puriata River southward—at the point where the Buin Road crossed—on a north-facing bend, later known as Galvin's Crossing. The following day the Japanese were forced off a small knoll close to the river and the road, about 1 km (0.62 mi) south of the crossing. On 6 March, Japanese shelling of the knoll wounded an Australian, Private Carl Slater, who held his post until relieved. He was the only casualty during this period, and the knoll was named after him. (Note: The Japanese called the knoll "Goshu-dai", which translates as "Australian Heights".) Throughout March, the 25th Infantry Battalion continued to expand its perimeter, to the north and south, along the Buin Road, while the 9th moved west from Mosigetta to link up with them and the 61st skirted east around Makapeka. By late March, though, heavy rain temporarily stopped the Australian advance, as the main road became impassable due to thick mud.

Although the Japanese sporadically shelled the knoll during March, there were no further Australian casualties. The 25th Infantry Battalion, which had established its headquarters and main defensive position around the knoll, in front of the Puriata River, sent out patrols every day, and on 9 March, one of these reported having killed 10 Japanese soldiers without loss to itself. The Japanese also began making dawn attacks, in which light machine gunners would approach by stealth, set up and fire on the Australian positions, then retire to their own lines, 250 yd (230 m) away. As the advance was halted, the Australians began to expect a major attack in the area of the knoll.

The Japanese launched a number of attacks on the Australians between 15 and 17 March. Under fire from three sides and in danger of being enveloped, on 19 March the Australians launched an attack of their own along the Buin Road, and although they had some success in clearing the forward Japanese positions, they then encountered a system of pillboxes and trenches around the Hatai Road junction. The 25th Infantry Battalion's commander, McKinna, ordered the two platoons led by Lieutenant Dick Jefferies to attack the pillboxes, supported by a section of machine guns, and several PIAT anti-tank weapons. A two-hour fire-fight and a bayonet charge followed. This attack was ultimately beaten back by the defenders with the loss of eight Australians killed and 14 wounded. A second attack was launched on 22 March. Supported by heavy artillery, mortars and machine guns, it proved successful, largely after the individual efforts of Corporal Reg Rattey, who single-handedly silenced several bunkers.

As the Australians began to prepare for the next stage of the offensive, important intelligence confirmed that the Japanese were planning a large-scale counterattack in the area. Believing that the Australian forces in the area surrounding the knoll were limited to just 400 men and observing that the Australians had not had time to reorganise, the Japanese XVII Army commander—Lieutenant General Masatane Kanda—ordered the 6th Division commander—Akinaga—to delay the Australian advance towards the south. Akinaga assessed that a counterattack against the Australian forces at this point with the entire weight of his division might be successful at this time and consequently he gave the order for his division to begin an attack across the Puriata. Akinaga planned to commit 2,000 men to the assault, while 1,300 would be held back to act as ammunition carriers.

According to Karl James, no detailed orders were produced for the attack and deliberate planning was hastily completed with little or no co-ordination between the attacking infantry regiments. In addition, to increase the size of the infantry force, troops from the field artillery regiment were quickly re-roled as riflemen. In the meantime, the Australians on Slater's Knoll, having been alerted to the possibility of a large-scale attack, began adjusting their defences. The soldiers cleared fields of fire and set out clear engagement areas to the north, northwest and south of the knoll, to allow maximum effectiveness of their supporting Vickers medium machine guns and Bren light machine guns. Barbed wire was laid out, and booby traps set.

== Battle ==
=== Probing raids ===
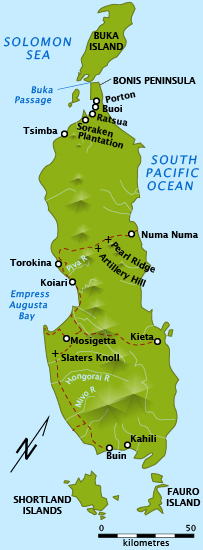
Some key locations in the Bougainville campaign.

The main attack was planned for 1 April, but as the various Japanese units moved into position, a number of minor probes were made by elements of the Japanese 6th Engineer Regiment in the Australian rear areas and along their line of communications. The first raid came on the night of 27/28 March, when a force of about 100 Japanese exploited a gap between the 25th Infantry Battalion's main defensive position and its 'B' Echelon—which included its transport and logistics elements and was protected by a company from the 61st Infantry Battalion—fixed bayonets and then assaulted the rear of the Australian perimeter. The Australians had been alerted to their approach after the communication line between the two positions had been cut, and when the attack began the men had already been roused and the weapons pits fully manned. As a result, the attack failed and was turned back. A number of Japanese survivors managed to dig-in near the perimeter and later fired upon the Australian clearing patrol that was sent out the following morning, as well as snipe at the company defending 'B' Echelon's position. Afterwards, the Australians counted 19 dead Japanese around their position, while they also managed to capture one of the wounded. Against this, the 25th Infantry Battalion had lost three killed and seven wounded.

Another probe was made early on the morning of 28 March on the positions of the Australian 5th Field Battery, whose eight guns were located east of Toko, on the west bank of the Puriata River from where they could provide defensive fires in support of the 25th Infantry Battalion's main positions on the knoll. Shortly before dawn one of the booby traps that the Australians had set around their perimeter to provide early warning was set off and one of the sentries opened fire upon what he believed to be a Japanese probe. A short time later, a small section of Japanese stumbled into one of the forward positions and fire was exchanged. Later, as a team was sent out to disarm the remaining booby traps, this team was fired upon and sporadic fighting continued until midday.

That evening, around 23:00, the 9th Infantry Battalion's rear echelon at Barara, along the Toko–Mosigetta–Buin Road, came under attack. Under the command of the battalion second-in-command, and possessing only four Bren light machine guns for direct fire support, they were nevertheless able to hold off the initial attack. Following this, sporadic fighting continued into the early morning, when at 04:45 on 29 March a force of about 100 Japanese attacked the position supported by sustained machine gun and rifle fire. Rushing the Australian position with bayonets, they were beaten back by stiff defence and fell back from the position, leaving behind 23 dead but taking their wounded with them. Four Australians were wounded in this encounter.

Throughout 29 March, the Japanese continued the tactic of using small-scale attacks to test the Australian defences and isolate the 25th Infantry Battalion's forward companies from its headquarters and rear. Over the course of the morning and into the afternoon, one of its companies was probed, while the headquarters also came under attack. The company from the 61st Infantry Battalion protecting the 25th Infantry Battalion's line of communications also came under attack from the 70 Japanese that were believed to be entrenched between the 'B' Echelon and the 25th's main positions, suffering two killed and two wounded. Later, it became clear to the Australians that the Japanese were preparing for a major attack against Slater's Knoll, following the capture of a Japanese sergeant who confirmed that the probes were, in the words of Gavin Long, the "prelude to a full-scale offensive".

These probes intensified on 30 March, as one of the 25th Infantry Battalion's companies was strongly attacked by the Japanese. The Australian position had been weakened by having about a third of its strength out on patrol at the time of the attack. Unable to return to the perimeter while the company was under fire, they were forced to link up with one of the other companies further north. Meanwhile, the company was attacked four times throughout the day. The first three attacks were repulsed before the last attack came at 13:00, preceded by a heavy mortar bombardment. Twelve Japanese were killed in the attack, while one Australian was killed and two were missing in action. Nevertheless, the Australian position had been made untenable and they were forced to withdraw and link up with the company to the north. In doing so they left behind three mortars and a quantity of ammunition which the Japanese later brought into action against them.

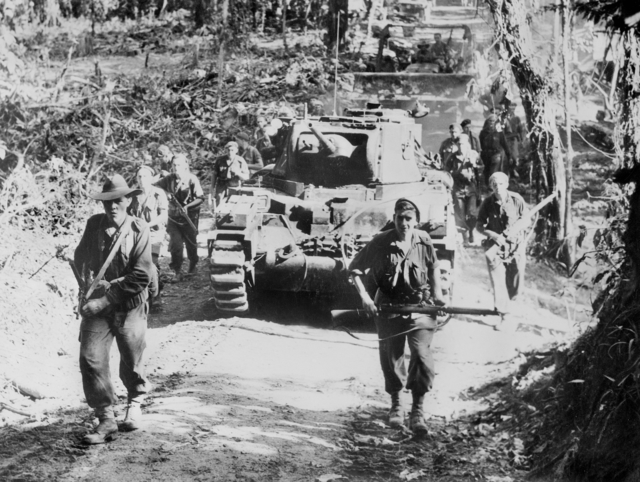
Matilda II tanks of the Australian 2/4th Armoured Regiment advancing towards Slater's Knoll on 30 March 1945

Communications between the brigade and battalion headquarters and the forward company positions broke down at this stage and runners had to be dispatched to pass a message asking for artillery support. Meanwhile, the supply situation for the Australians also became desperate as they had consumed all of their rations and had run out of water. The water situation was solved by digging a well within the perimeter, but it became clear that reinforcements were required. The Australian divisional commander, Bridgeford, subsequently placed a squadron of Matilda tanks under Major Kenneth Arnott from the 2/4th Armoured Regiment at the 7th Brigade commander's disposal, and over the course of the day these tanks were brought up towards the 25th's position from Toko where they had been put ashore from landing craft. Engineers were used to bridge a number of creeks and streams, while bulldozers were also employed to improve the terrain or to pull the tanks along when they were unable to move under their own power.

This was the first time tanks had been used in the campaign and the going was slow. By 19:00 on 30 March they reached the 'B' Echelon position. Early on 31 March the tanks moved up to the battalion headquarters on Slater's Knoll where they were escorted by a platoon from the headquarters company and moved out again, once again using bulldozers to improve the ground in front of them. Just as they did, the Japanese launched an attack on one of the isolated companies. When they were 400 yd (370 m) from the forward positions, the infantry deployed to the left and right of the tanks and they began their advance to contact, arriving just in time to help defeat the Japanese attack.

As the forward companies began to move back towards the main defensive position, jeeps were sent up to collect the wounded while McKinna led a force of two platoons and two tanks out to the perimeter at the Hatai junction. There they were able to reclaim the mortars that had earlier been abandoned and destroyed them so that they could not be used against the Australians again, but the jeeps carrying the wounded ran into a Japanese ambush in which five Australians were killed. McKinna then organised a quick counterattack, taking a force up the road along with three tanks and subsequently attacking the ambushing force, killing 11, before forming a harbour around the tanks for the night.

=== First major assault ===
The next morning, 1 April, the Australians extended across the Kero Creek and advanced north to the Puriata where they established a perimeter 1,000 yd (910 m) south of Slater's Knoll. Around 12:00, the Japanese 6th Field Artillery Regiment, whose gunners had been converted to the role of infantry, set up a form-up position 50 m (55 yd) to the front of the Australian company holding the perimeter to the south of Slater's Knoll at a location the Japanese called Pain, which lay along the Buin Road. Before the attack could be launched, the Australians detected the movement of the Japanese and began firing upon them. Shortly after 12:40, the Japanese gunners launched their assault. Firing their weapons from the hip, they rushed the Australian position, pushing the defenders back, leaving dead and wounded behind. That evening, the Australians launched a series of determined counterattacks in order to re-establish contact between Slater's Knoll and the forward companies, however, these were turned back.

Location of the Battle of Slater's Knoll in south west Bougainville.

Meanwhile, the Japanese 23rd Infantry Regiment, which had advanced on the right flank from Barara (Note: The Japanese name for this location was "Bara Bara".) attempted to move on Slater's Knoll from the north. Finding its way blocked by wire obstacles and lacking the equipment necessary to remove them, it was forced to halt its advance and cover the flank of Colonel Toyoji Muta's 13th Infantry Regiment, which was attempting to launch an assault across the Puriata. At this point, the river was about 100 m (110 yd) across and 1 m (3.3 ft) deep, while the opposite bank was about 1 m (3.3 ft) high. The crossing began at 03:00 on 1 April, and the three battalions made heavy work of it. When they were halfway across, the two forward battalions were spotted by the Australians in the moonlight and engaged with machine gun and rifle fire. The Japanese quickly deployed and attempted to launch an attack; however, in the confusion the 1st Battalion, 23rd Infantry Regiment was cut off from the rest of the assault force. As daylight came, the Australians were able to call down mortar fire on the Japanese, causing considerable casualties. Running low on ammunition and having suffered considerable losses, the 23rd Infantry were forced to withdraw. The 1st Battalion remained cut off until the evening of 1 April, when it was able to re-establish contact with the other two battalions and report to the divisional commander that the attack had been unsuccessful.

=== Lull in the battle and secondary attack ===
On 2 April, the Japanese divisional commander, Akinaga, called the 13th and 23rd Infantry Regiments back across the Puriata, to a position south-west of the Pain feature. At this point, the decision was made to launch a fresh attack aimed at taking Slater's Knoll and eliminating the Australian forces in the area surrounding the Puriata ford. The attack was scheduled for 5 April, and over the course of the following three days, contact was minimal. In this time, there were a few minor skirmishes, and small groups of Japanese were seen by the Australians around Barara, Slater's Knoll and Mosigetta. As further intelligence reports came in, it became clear to the Australian commanders that the Japanese were about to deliver the main attack.

On the night of 4/5 April, the Japanese heavily shelled the Australian artillery battery, while communications between brigade headquarters and the 25th Infantry Battalion headquarters were severed, as were the lines from the 25th Infantry Battalion's headquarters to its forward companies. Suspecting that the attack was about to commence, runners were sent and the men defending Slater's Knoll, now consisting of a force of only 129 men from 'B' Company, stood-to.

At 05:00 on 5 April, the Japanese launched an attack from the north. This was followed almost simultaneously by a stronger attack from the south-west. For the next 80 minutes, 900–1,100 Japanese from the 13th and 23rd Infantry Regiments attacked the small Australian force in waves. They overwhelmed the Australian forward positions, but finding their way blocked by wire obstacles and lacking any equipment to deal with them the Japanese attack stalled. Quickly, the situation was turned back in favour of the Australians, and the Japanese were cut down by heavy defensive artillery fire and by well-sited machine guns. A further attack was launched by a smaller force along the Buin Road and aimed at two of the forward companies positioned there. This attack was beaten back also. After regrouping, the surviving members of the 13th Infantry Regiment began preparing for a final charge, determined to fight to the last man. Their commander, Colonel Muta, in a final act of defiance wrapped his unit's banner around his waist and armed himself with a grenade with which to blow himself up during the assault. Elsewhere, the remaining officers of the 23rd Infantry made a pact to hurl themselves against the Australians one last time in a suicidal charge. Nevertheless, Akinaga, realising that further assaults were futile, finally dispatched the order to cancel the attack. At around 08:30, the Australians realised that the Japanese had decided that they had had enough. Just after midday, two tanks were dispatched from the 'B' Echelon perimeter, escorted by a company from the 61st Infantry Battalion, arriving on the knoll by 13:45 where they were used as fire support as the Australians began to carry out mopping up operations, flushing out small groups of survivors all around the position.

== Aftermath ==
The day after the final Japanese assault on the knoll, 292 dead Japanese were counted around 'B' Company's perimeter. In total, over the course of the battle, the Australians counted 620 Japanese killed, and estimated that another 1,000 had probably been wounded. Information obtained from captured Japanese clarified that the Australians had come up against a force of at least 2,400 troops. The commander of the 23rd Infantry Regiment, Lieutenant Colonel Kawano Koji, was among the dead, as was a senior divisional staff officer, Lieutenant Colonel Honda Matsuo. Four wounded Japanese were also taken prisoner of war. Casualties for the Australians included 10 officers and 179 other ranks killed or wounded, while there had been a further 81 Australians evacuated due to non-combat related issues. Wartime Japanese casualty estimates vary from these figures, though, claiming to have killed 1,800 Australians, while placing their own losses at 280 killed and 320 wounded. Long argues that these figures are problematic, as based upon the same report, the Japanese believed that there were only 400 Australians in the region during the battle, and yet they claimed to have killed almost five times that number.

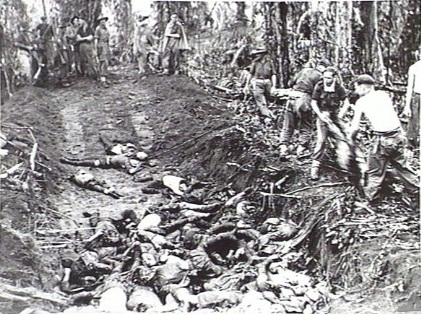
Japanese killed during the final assault on Slater's Knoll are buried the day after the battle

The result of the battle had a profound effect on the Japanese commanders. According to James, Kanda had been "so certain of victory...[he]...had not developed any plans for...subsequent activities". After the battle, the Japanese forces in the area pulled back to the Hongorai River, where they were reorganised due to the heavy losses, with several infantry, engineer and artillery units being amalgamated. Lacking food, suffering the effects of disease, and isolated from home, morale amongst the Japanese troops fell heavily, with many realising that the war was lost. There was an increase in desertions at this time, although the vast majority continued to fight, if only because they were under orders to do so.

Operationally, the battle proved to the Australian high command how effective armour could be when used in close co-operation with infantry and in protecting the lines of communication. The use of machine gun carriers to carry out the wounded had also been quite effective. While the Japanese soldiers and officers on the ground fought bravely, continuing the assault even when it was clear it had failed, ultimately the battle proved to be a decisive Australian victory; however, James notes that poor planning and unreliable communications had also contributed to the result. Long goes on to argue that if the Japanese commander had been more flexible in his tactics, the result might have been different. The Australian right flank had been vulnerable, but Akinaga did not exploit this opportunity.

There were tactical deficiencies as well, particularly the predictability of cutting Australian signals lines just before an attack and bunching together in tight groups during an assault, allowing the Australians to take full toll with their machine guns. The Australian commander of the 25th Infantry Battalion, McKinna, had spread out his companies effectively and went forward to direct the fighting at several points. Fields of fire had been cleared, perimeters set and patrolling had been maintained. Nevertheless, the Australians had also failed to seize opportunities as they arose, for after the battle they did not follow up their success immediately. After the failure of the final assault, the Japanese had possessed no forces in the immediate vicinity that would have been capable of resisting any follow up forces that the Australians might have been able to bring up, and it is possible that an advance could have been carried all the way to the Hongorai River. As it was, however, the Australian line of supply was stretched and it was necessary for a pause before the advance could continue in earnest.

In the days immediately after the battle, the Australians continued to carry out patrolling operations around the knoll. On 7 April, a patrol from the 9th Infantry Battalion clashed with a Japanese force of about 30 men and in the ensuing engagement four Japanese were killed, while a patrol from the 61st Infantry Battalion on 8 April killed another five. On 13 April, the order was given that the 7th Brigade would be gradually withdrawn and relieved by the 15th. Shortly afterwards, the 58th/59th Infantry Battalion replaced the 25th in occupation of the knoll, while the 24th Infantry Battalion resumed the advance along the Buin Road on 17 April, subsequently taking part in the fighting along the Hongorai River. The 9th Infantry Battalion, however, was not withdrawn immediately, and remained in the northern area until it handed over to the 57th/60th Infantry Battalion in early May. The fighting on Bougainville continued throughout April as the Japanese resisted the Australian advance, and continued until July when the fighting petered out due to heavy rain and flooding.

After the war, the battle honour of "Slater's Knoll" was awarded to the 25th Infantry Battalion and the 2/4th Armoured Regiment. Neither the 9th or 61st Infantry Battalions were similarly credited, although according to Gordon Maitland there seems to be no explanation as to why. For his actions during the attack on the Japanese pillboxes on 22 March, Rattey later received the Victoria Cross. Initially, his battalion commander, McKinna, had nominated him for the lesser Distinguished Conduct Medal, but on review by Field, the brigade commander, the nomination was elevated. It was subsequently announced in the London Gazette in July 1945.
