= 38th Independent Mixed Brigade =

The 38th Independent Mixed Brigade was an infantry brigade in the Imperial Japanese Army. Formed from 17th division in June 1944 attached to the 17th Army under the command of Major General Kesao Kijima. The brigade fought at the battle of Pearl Ridge against the Australian advance but was defeated on 1 January 1945 after three days. The retreat of the brigade southwards towards Buin was refused, and it subsequently became isolated at Numa Numa until the cessation of hostilities.

== See also ==
- Independent Mixed Brigades (Imperial Japanese Army)
