= Battle of Pearl Ridge =

Part of the Bougainville campaign in World War II

- Part of the Bougainville Campaign of the Pacific Theater (World War II)
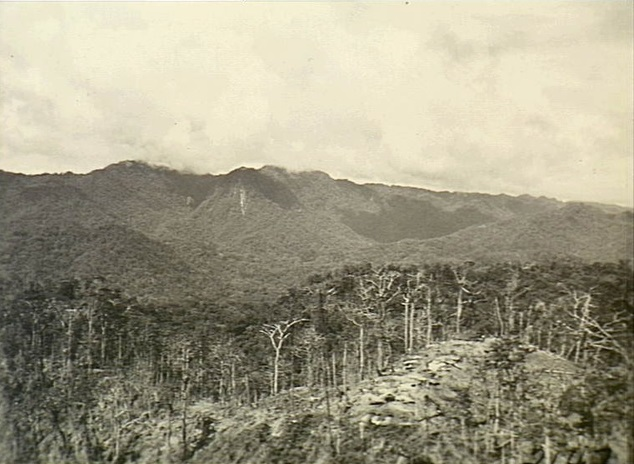
- An aerial view of Pearl Ridge after the battle
Date	30–31 December 1944
Location	Bougainville, New Guinea
Result	Australian victory

Belligerents
Australia	(Empire of Japan) Japan

Commanders and leaders
(Australia) John Field (Australia) John McKinna	(Empire of Japan) Kesao Kijima

Units involved
25th Infantry Battalion	38th Independent Mixed Brigade 81st Infantry Regiment

Strength
~800	~550

Casualties and losses
10 killed 25 wounded	34 killed 1 captured

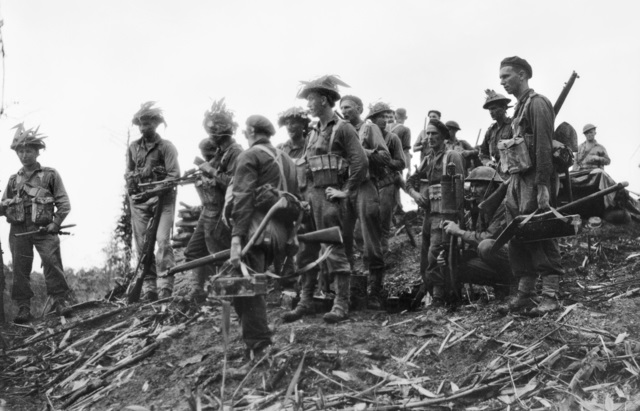
Soldiers from the Australian 25th Infantry Battalion prior to the attack

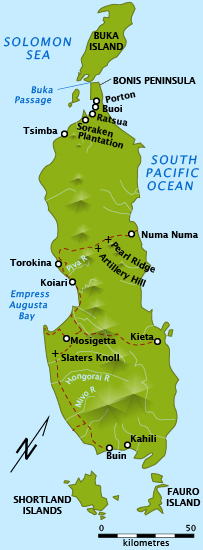
Some key locations in the Bougainville campaign.

The Battle of Pearl Ridge (30–31 December 1944) was an engagement of the Second World War fought between Australian and Japanese forces on Bougainville Island. Part of the wider Bougainville Campaign, the battle took place in the central sector of the island, shortly after the Australians had taken over responsibility from the Americans. Believing that the ridge was held by less than a company of Japanese, on 30 December the Australian 25th Infantry Battalion launched a four-pronged attacked the ridge. The defending force, however, had been greatly reinforced by elements of the 38th Independent Mixed Brigade and was closer to a battalion in strength. After being held up on the right of their advance, the Australians dug in overnight and repulsed a strong Japanese counterattack before resuming the attack on 31 December. By late in the afternoon, the Japanese had been swept off the ridge. The Australians later established an observation post on the ridge, which had commanding views of the whole island, and throughout the remainder of the campaign used it to control artillery fire as they advanced towards Japanese enclaves in the north and south of the island.

== Background ==
=== Strategic situation ===
The Japanese had captured Bougainville in early 1942, and had subsequently built it into a significant base with large numbers of aircraft and troops, in order to protect the fortress at Rabaul. Following this, Allied planners determined that their key strategy in the region would be reduction of the base at Rabaul. To do this, they needed airfields within range, and as such, it was decided to secure the western part of Bougainville, landing around Torokina in November 1943. Heavy fighting followed the landing, but after a large-scale Japanese counter-attack was defeated in March 1944, the Japanese withdrew from the US lodgement and subsequently a period of relative quiet followed as the US forces limited themselves to patrolling and establishing outposts, rather than large-scale operations.

In late 1944, as part of the buildup of US forces for an offensive in the Philippines, Allied planners decided to free up US forces in the region by having Australian forces replace them in the Aitape–Wewak area of New Guinea, Bougainville, and on New Britain. Advanced Australian elements began arriving on Bougainville in September and by November–December 1944 four brigades from the Australian II Corps took over responsibility for Bougainville from the divisions of US XIV Corps that had been stationed there previously. Allied intelligence reports and estimates regarding Japanese strength varied, but the considered position of the Australians was that there were around 17,500 Japanese on the island. Although understrength, these troops were reported to still be capable of conducting effective combat operations and continued to pose a threat to the Allied base at Torokina. As such, in mid-December, after a period of information gathering, it was decided that the Australian II Corps, consisting of Militiamen from the 3rd Division and the 11th Brigade would go on the offensive. A three-pronged campaign was subsequently planned in the northern, central and southern sectors of the island. After the war, it was found that Australian intelligence estimates were significantly in error, with Japanese strength being more than 40,000.

=== Preliminary moves ===
Initially, Brigadier John Field's 7th Brigade was given responsibility for the central sector, and in November the brigade began operations to clear the Japanese from the high features in the sector along the Numa Numa Trail. Due to the steep terrain, which was covered with thick jungle and punctuated with numerous waterways, the Australians could only establish a small frontage, with one battalion forward on the trail, with its constituent companies spread singly in a line across the razorback ridge line. On 23 November, in what was the first Australian operation of the campaign following the relief of the Americans, the Australian 9th Infantry Battalion captured a Japanese outpost on a feature known to the Australians as "Little George", supported by machine guns, mortars and artillery. Two Australians were killed or died of wounds, while six others were wounded. This attack was followed up by a second in mid-December, when the 9th captured a Japanese outpost on "Artillery Hill".

Shortly after this, the Australian 25th Infantry Battalion—under Lieutenant Colonel John McKinna—relieved the 9th Infantry Battalion at Artillery Hill and began patrolling operations towards the Japanese position on "Pearl Ridge", a feature which due to its height offered commanding views of the entire island. According to James, this ridge was one of the "strongest positions along the Numa Numa trail" and it "dominated the high ground across the Empire Range". The Japanese had been using the ridge to observe Australian movements to the west and was also the point where the "three main east–west overland routes across the island converged".

== Battle ==
The Australians spent Christmas Day patrolling forward in concert with Royal Australian Air Force Boomerang fighters from No. 4 Squadron RAAF carrying out reconnaissance flights ahead of their position. Throughout the evening, the Japanese launched an attack against one of the Australian companies, but this was turned back by the defenders. For several days, the Australian battalion commander formulated a plan to capture Pearl Ridge, possession of which would enable the Australians to block Japanese attempts to approach the main Allied base around Torokina, and would disrupt the movement of Japanese troops along the north–south axis of the island, hindering their ability to reinforce isolated pockets.

Believing that the ridge was held by two understrength companies from the Japanese 81st Infantry Regiment—approximately 80–90 men—who had withdrawn there after the fighting on Little George and Artillery Hill, the Australians decided to commit only a battalion to capture it. On the morning of 30 December, after 40 minutes of airstrikes from Royal New Zealand Air Force Corsairs, who had been guided onto their targets by RAAF Boomerangs, the roughly 800-strong 25th Battalion carried out an attack supported by artillery and machine gun fire with four companies advancing across a 1,000-yard (910 m) frontage stretching across the ridge. Unbeknown to the Australians, however, the two companies from the 81st Infantry Regiment had been reinforced by men from the Japanese 38th Independent Mixed Brigade under Major General Kesao Kijima and they actually numbered 550. They had heavily fortified the ridge, establishing a series of bunkers and pillboxes between weapons pits that were linked with trenches. However, due to the steep terrain, they were only able to move three mortars onto the position, and there were no other heavy weapons. They were also unable to haul bulk water to the position, and had to rely on constant resupply by foot.

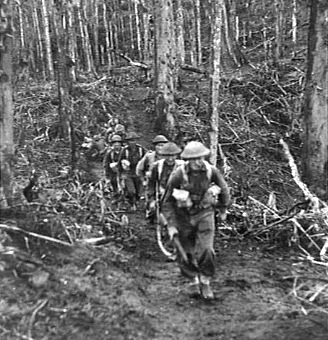
Men from the Australian 25th Battalion during the Battle of Pearl Ridge, 30 December 1944

Establishing air posts, and supply dumps on Artillery Hill and Werda's Knoll, the Australians advanced from Artillery Ridge, where the battalion headquarters was established well forward for the attack. A broad front assault with all four companies forward, the Australian commander's tactic was a departure from the narrow front attacks that had been mounted against Little George and Artillery Hill. Although the left-most Australian company—'C' Company under Captain Wallace Bruce—managed to reach the ridge pushing through thick bamboo and killing several Japanese, due to the terrain Lieutenant Bruce Shaw's 'A' Company, on the far right of the Australian line and having stepped off from Artillery Hill, was forced into advancing across a narrow razorback only 12 ft (3.7 m) wide, along which the Japanese were able to concentrate a significant amount of fire from the north-east from a feature dubbed "Pear Hill". Confronted by a deep bomb crater, which blocked their path, the Australians became pinned. As more artillery fire was brought down on the ridge in support of the attack, an attempt was made to outflank the Japanese position in front of the razorback, although this too proved unsuccessful as the Japanese defenders began rolling grenades down the slope. After the Australians had suffered a number of casualties the attack on the right was called off and Shaw's company was ordered to form a defensive position and await further orders. The Australian commander, McKinna, then ordered the two companies in the centre—Captain Charles Gabel's 'B' Company and 'D' Company under Captain Malcolm Just—to dig-in where they were, while the left-most company under Bruce, who had reached the Japanese track on the north-eastern side of the ridge, also dug-in with the intention of holding its position until daybreak.

That night, the Japanese made a minor attack against 'C' Company, but this was turned back with artillery and small arms. The following day the Australians resumed their attack. In doing so, McKinna ordered 'D' Company to renew the assault, aiming for Pear Hill, on the right hand side of the Australian line. Although it required a more physically draining approach march over Artillery Hill and through dense scrub, the tactic proved to be more successful than the previous day's efforts. Pear Hill was joined by a narrow razorback ridge that limited the Australian frontage to just three men side-by-side, who had to cut their way through the thick bamboo with machetes. Weighed down with full marching order and heavy weapons, including Vickers machine guns, the Australians found it heavy going. It took the majority of the afternoon to reach the crest of the hill where they were to form up for the final assault. A thirty-minute pause followed, after which an artillery barrage was called down upon the Japanese defenders. On their right, 'A' Company, began to draw the Japanese fire and at 15:30 hours 'D' Company attacked the ridge, across a thin saddle. By late afternoon, the Japanese defenders had pulled back from the ridge, leaving the Australians in possession of it after heavy fighting with 'D' Company securing the main position, while 'B' Company skirted north of Barton's Knoll and secured a secondary position below the ridge, which the Australians dubbed Baker's Brow. Meanwhile, on the Australian left—the western side of the battlefield—a heavy machine gun and snipers held up 'C' Company's advance.

After dark, around 22:00 hours, the Japanese began probing the defences around the position that 'C' Company had established. At first this was limited to minor harassment tactics in an effort to locate the Australian positions. 'A' Company was also probed. In the early morning the Japanese launched a strong counter-attack from the south and south-east of 'C' Company's position. Amidst heavy fighting, the Japanese fought their way into the two forward Australian pits and close quarters fighting ensued. After an hour, the attack was repulsed with artillery support and at first light on the Australians sent out patrols, which found the ridge abandoned. Throughout the morning and into the early afternoon, the Australians undertook mopping up operations before the ridge was finally cleared in the early afternoon. With control of Pearl Ridge, the Australians secured a vantage point from where they could see from one side of Bougainville to the other, a distance of over 30 miles (48 km); this would later facilitate further operations around the island providing the Australians were a vantage point for artillery observation.

== Aftermath ==
During the course of the battle, the Australians lost 10 killed and 25 wounded, while 34 Japanese bodies were found on the position, with several more lying in irretrievable positions down the steep slopes. In addition one Japanese soldier was taken prisoner. According to the Australian official historian, Gavin Long, the attack on Pearl Ridge was a significant gain for the Australians, not only strategically but morally. Having been put in against a force of roughly equal size, consisting of troops who were significantly more experienced than the Australians, whose only previous combat experience had been two years earlier during the Battle of Milne Bay, Long argues that the battle highlighted the effectiveness of the training the 25th Infantry Battalion had undertaken prior to deploying to Bougainville. James also supports this view, stating that McKinna's skilled leadership and aggressive nature had also been a strong factor. Meanwhile, for the Japanese, the loss of Pearl Ridge damaged the prestige of the 38th Mixed Independent Brigade, with Japanese commanders ascribing the loss to poor support from their artillery and mortars. James attributes this to the limited infrastructure in the area, and the lack of defensive construction or development undertaken following the Japanese capture of the island in 1942.

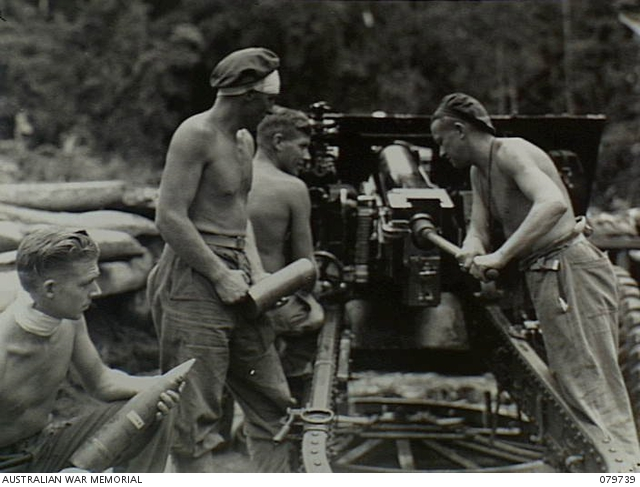
Australian artillerymen fire a 25-pounder from Pearl Ridge, March 1945

Following the battle of Pearl Ridge, the Australians launched a full-scale offensive to counter the Japanese resistance on the island, focused on the southern sector. As a result of this decision, the 7th Brigade was moved from the central sector to the southern sector, where the majority of the Japanese forces were located. They would subsequently see heavy fighting around Slater's Knoll in March and April 1945. The 11th Brigade, under Brigadier John Stevenson, then took control of both the central and northern sectors in order to free up troops for the main offensive in the south, and the brigade subsequently cycled its three infantry battalions through the position, while pursuing a limited advance in the north, attacking Tsimba Ridge in January – February 1945 after advancing along the coast from Kuraio Mission. The brigade maintained a battalion-group element on Pearl Ridge during this phase and carried out extensive patrols forward of the position, while artillery from the 4th Field Regiment was brought up to the foot of the Laruma escarpment from where they could fire on Japanese positions under the control of forward observers on Pearl Ridge. Initially, this artillery consisted of a battery of short 25 pounders, but it was later replaced by the longer-range long 25 pounders.

In an effort to improve the Australian line of communications in the sector, engineers from the 16th Field Company later constructed a road using a bulldozer that had to haul itself up the ridge via a steel cable that was manhandled up to a point just below the ridge over the course of eight days. A light rail system was also established between Barges' Hill and Pearl Ridge.

Due to the terrain around the ridge, the Australians had to allocate a significant amount of resources to bring in supplies to the forces later stationed around Pearl Ridge. The rate of effort required to bring stores forward was of significant concern to the Australian corps commander, Lieutenant General Stanley Savige, to the extent that his orders to the commander of the 11th Brigade stipulated no further advances in the sector, with the exception of patrolling to prevent the movement of Japanese reinforcements towards the south, and for information gathering purposes. These patrols subsequently went out with native police guides, exploiting quite deep into the jungle over several days over long distances—one was even pushed to the eastern coast around the Numa Numa Plantation—and proved quite successful for the Australians in harassing the Japanese in the area. Over the course of 14 weeks at least 236 Japanese were killed by these patrols, while the Australians lost four killed and 19 wounded. Four Japanese were also captured. In mid-April, the 23rd Brigade, under Brigadier Arnold Potts, took control of the central sector and in June a new offensive was opened in the area. This lasted through until the end of the war in August.

After the war, the 25th Infantry Battalion was awarded the battle honour of "Pearl Ridge" for the battle. This honour was later inherited by units of the Royal Queensland Regiment.
