= Warrego =

Warrego may refer to:

- the Warrego River, which flows from south-west Queensland through north-west New South Wales, until it merges with the Darling River
- the Electoral district of Warrego, an electoral district for the Queensland Legislative Assembly, which encompasses several towns on the Warrego River
- HMAS Warrego, two ships of the Royal Australian Navy named after the river
