= Richard Jefferies (disambiguation) =

Richard Jefferies may refer to:

- Richard Jefferies (1848–1887), English nature writer
- Richard Jefferies (curator) (born 1945), English curator of the Watts Gallery, 1985–2006
- Richard Jefferies (screenwriter) (born 1956), American screenwriter, film producer, film director and editor
- Richard Manning Jefferies (1889–1964), American state legislator and Governor of South Carolina, 1942–1943
- Dick Jefferies (died 2020), paleontologist
- Richard Jefferies (canoeist) (born 1987), British Olympic canoeist
- Richard Jefferies (businessman) (1920–2013), Australian Army officer and businessman

== See also ==
- Richard Jeffrey (disambiguation)
