= Kesao =

- Gender: Male

Origin
- Origin: Japanese
- Meaning: Different meanings depending on the kanji used

Kesao (written: 袈裟雄 or 今朝雄) is a masculine Japanese given name. Notable people with the name include:

- Kesao Kijima (木島 袈裟雄; 1889–1965) Japanese general
- Kesao Takamizawa (高見沢 今朝雄; born 1952), Japanese astronomer
