= Richard Jeffrey (disambiguation) =

Richard Jeffrey is an American philosopher.

Richard Jeffrey may also refer to:

- Richard Jeffrey (bobsleigh)

== See also ==
- Richard Jefferies (disambiguation)
