= SS Tasman (1921) =

Dutch vessel under Allied command in the South Pacific during World War II

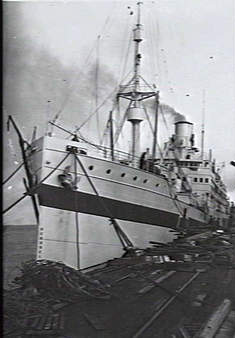
- Tasman in Port Melbourne 23 June 1943

History

Netherlands
- Name: SS Tasman
- Operator: Koninklijke Paketvaart-Maatschappij
- Builder: Earle's Shipbuilding and Engineering Company Ltd, Hull
- Laid down: 1921
- In service: 1921
- Out of service: To Australia, 1943
- In service: Returned, 1 July 1947
- Fate: Sold for scrapping, 1958
- Name: SWPA permanent fleet service: Tasman (X-16)
- In service: 26 March 1942
- Out of service: July 1945
- Fate: Returned to owners, 1 July 1947; Scrapped in Hong Kong, 1958

General characteristics
- Type: Passenger ship / Hospital ship
- Tonnage: 4,922 gross register tons (GRT)
- Length: 392 ft 0 in (119.5 m)
- Beam: 49 ft 2 in (15.0 m)
- Draught: 26 ft 0 in (7.9 m)
- Decks: 2
- Propulsion: 2 vertical triple expansion engines
- Speed: 12 knots (13,059.1 sm/h)
- Capacity: 96 passengers / 250 patients
- Armament: None

SS Tasman was a 4,922 gross register tons (GRT) Dutch steamship built by Earle's Shipbuilding and Engineering Company Limited, Hull in 1921 for Koninklijke Paketvaart-Maatschappij (KPM), Batavia. With outbreak of the World War II in the Pacific and the fall of the Dutch East Indies, Tasman was one of 21 KPM vessels that sought refuge in Australia. These ships became the core of the initial Southwest Pacific Area (SWPA) command's permanent local fleet under U.S. Army control. After general service as a transport, the ship was converted to a hospital ship at Melbourne. The ship, under the Dutch flag and Dutch certification under the Hague Convention, served the remainder of the war as a Dutch hospital ship.

== Koninklijke Paketvaart-Maatschappij (KPM) ==
Tasman was built for the Singapore, Java and Australian east coast trade and was on the Australian route until 1928 when the new twin screw turbinesteamers Nieuw Holland and Nieuw Zeeland took over the route. Tasman served the Java–South Africa route until transferred to the South Pacific New Zealand-Sydney service.

At the outbreak of hostilities between Japan and China in 1937, Tasman was docked at the city of Shanghai during the bombing of Shanghai, but escaped undamaged.

On the outbreak of war in the Pacific, December 1941 the ship was in the Timor Sea from which she was sent to Singapore. On 1 January 1942 she evacuated civilians and elements of the Royal Air Force. Arriving in Surabaya the RAF personnel were left and more civilian evacuees were loaded for Australia.

== World War II SWPA service ==
Tasman was one of the 21 KPM ships that sought refuge in Australia on the fall of Java that the Commanding General, United States Army Forces in Australia (USAFIA) was instructed to purchase or charter for an SWPA local fleet. On 26 March 1942 the Chief Quartermaster, USAFIA arranged interim charters pending final negotiations with the Netherlands Government in London. Final negotiations between the War Shipping Administration (WSA) and the Dutch government resulted in their being placed under U.S. Army control through a complex charter arrangement in which the British Ministry War Transport (BMWT) chartered the KPM vessels and with WSA allocated them to SWPA with the stipulation they be under total control of the U.S. Army. Though some sources note the arrangement was through the Allied Consultative Shipping Council (ACSC), Masterson details the command's objection and rejection of ships intended for critical military operations being arranged by that means. General MacArthur reported on 28 April that his fleet of 28 vessels included the 21 KPM ships. Tasman was given the local fleet number X-16. (Note: From early March 1943 SWPA assigned numbers to large ships in its permanent local fleet preceded with an "X" until 15 January 1945 when the "X" was changed to "Y" with retention of the number.)

=== Troop ship ===
The ship was converted at Sydney to carry troops. She transported both Australian and American troops to Port Moresby, Milne Bay and Oro Bay in New Guinea. On 11 July 1942 she had arrived at Milne Bay with Brigadier John Field and the 7th Brigade Group as "Milne Force" to protect the developing port and airfields. She was in Milne Bay the night before and left the morning of the Japanese landings and the first ship to reinforce Milne Bay during the Japanese attempt to take the airfields there. Tasman made three later attempts to enter the bay, being driven off by Japanese naval vessels. The ship was escorted by HMAS Arunta during these New Guinea operations.

=== Hospital ship ===
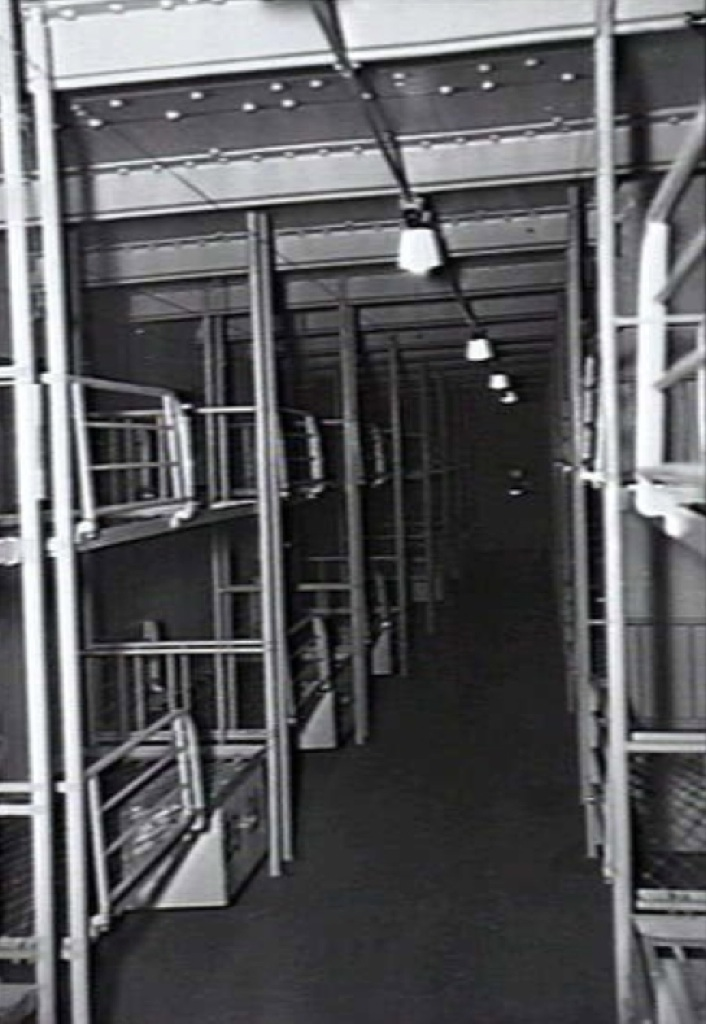
The interior of a ward aboard the hospital ship Tasman, 23 June 1943

In February 1943 SWPA notified the War Department that it was converting the ship to a hospital ship for intra-theater use, requesting it be certified under the Hague Convention. Though under the control of the U.S. Army, the ship, along with the other KPM hospital ship conversion Maetsuycker, was under "Dutch registry and certified under the Hague Convention by the Netherlands Government" and flew the Dutch flag. The conversion, with plans provided by Army engineers, was done during four months at Melbourne

She was equipped to carry 250 patients and continued to be crewed by Dutch officers and Javanese (Indonesian) sailors. The hospital was staffed by American doctors and nurses. She served in the South West Pacific area and, as was Maetsuycker, limited to transporting patients between bases in SWPA. Tasman was at the vanguard throughout the Pacific campaign and transported repatriated prisoners of war from the Japanese prison camps at Santo Tomas, Philippines.

=== Return to civilian use ===
In June 1945 Tasman entered Sydney for refit before being released from SWPA charter and returned to BMWT control in July. By October the ship was caught up in the turmoil of both Indonesian independence and Australian labor union activities with Indonesian seamen walking off, Australia declaring such non-European seamen illegal immigrants, labor listing the ship as "black" in sympathy with the Indonesian seamen and refusing any work related to the ship with a "scab crew" with charges and counter charges of "Communism" among labor leaders.

Tasman was returned to the Dutch Government in December 1945 still under the command of Captain Willem Eleveld, who had commanded the ship from 1941 through the war. He described her as "lucky" as she had never been bombed despite constant operations.

== Post-war ==
After the end of World War II, she was returned to her owners KPM on 1 July 1947. Later she was transferred to Koninklijke Java-China Paketvaart Lijnen in 1948 before being transferred back to KPM in 1955. She was sold and broken up for scrap in Hong Kong in 1958.
