= 562nd Air Defense Artillery Regiment =

Air defense regiment of the United States Army

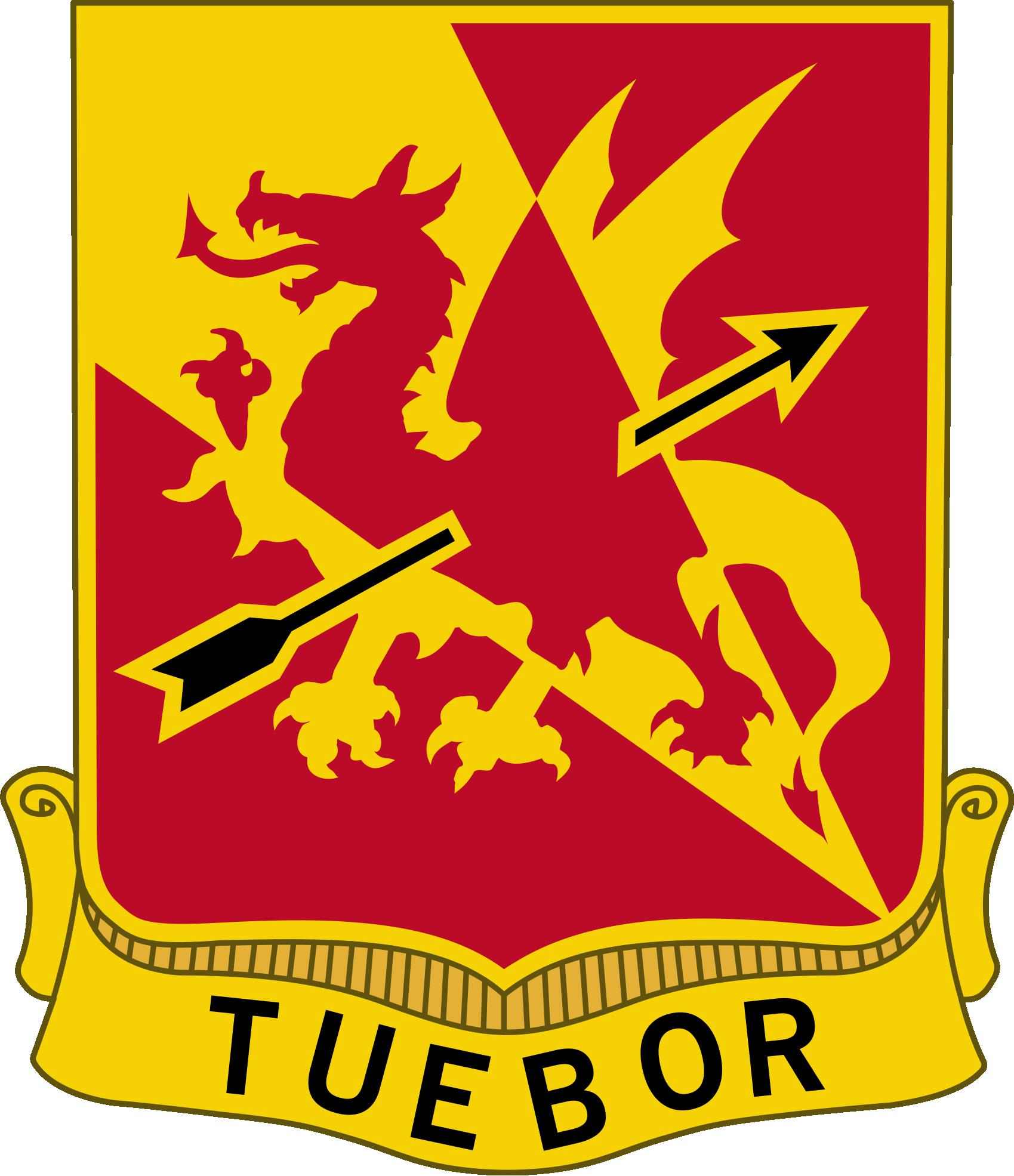
562d ADA Regiment DUI

The 562nd Air Defense Artillery Regiment was an air defense regiment of the United States Army. It was organized under the Combat Arms Regimental System.

21 AAA Battalion (AW)(SP) was constituted 5 September 1928 in the Organized Reserves as the 2nd Battalion, 562nd Coast Artillery Regiment (Antiaircraft). Redesignated as the 2nd Battalion, 917th Coast Artillery Regiment (Antiaircraft) and organized in Virginia on 30 November 1929. Allotted to the Regular Army, redesignated as the 2nd Battalion, 70th Coast Artillery Regiment (Antiaircraft) and activated at Fort Monroe, VA on 4 November 1939. During World War II, the 70th Coast Artillery landed on Guadalcanal with the XIV Corps on 23 May 1943. On 10 November 1943 the 70th Coast Artillery Regiment was reorganized and redesignated as the 70th Antiaircraft Artillery Group.

The Institute of Heraldry official records state that the regiment's distinctive unit insignia was originally approved for the 917th Coast Artillery Regiment on 7 August 1935. It was redesignated for the 70th Coast Artillery (AA) Regiment on 19 January 1940. It was redesignated for the 70th Antiaircraft Artillery Gun Battalion on 15 April 1946.

The Headquarters and Headquarters Battery, 70th Antiaircraft Artillery Group, and the 70th and 21st Antiaircraft Artillery Battalions consolidated, reorganized, and redesignated 31 July 1959 as the 562d Artillery, a parent regiment under the Combat Arms Regimental System. Redesignated 1 September 1971 as the 562d Air Defense Artillery.

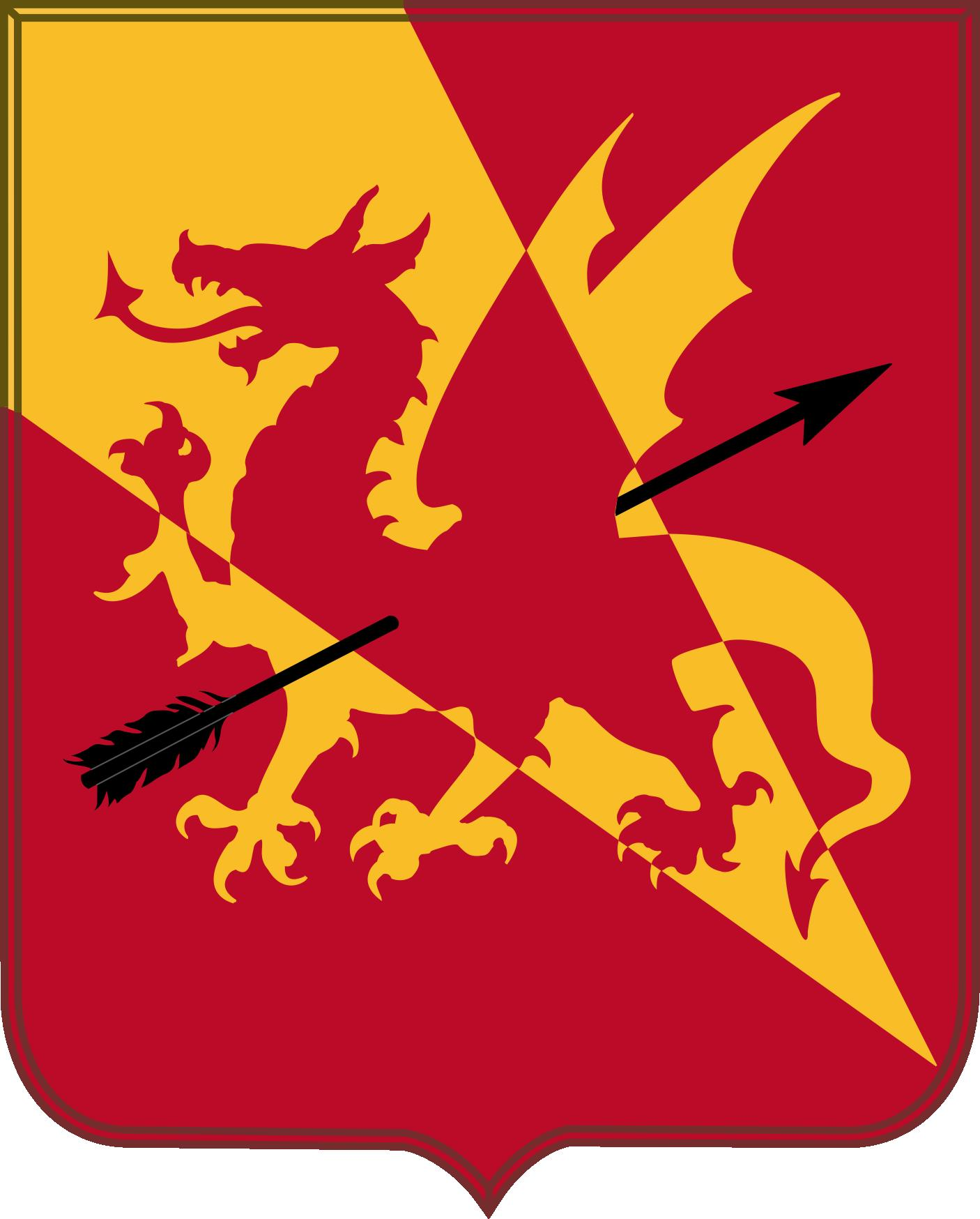
562d ADA Regiment Coat of Arms

Tim Aumiller's book lists deployments of battalions of the regiment as follows:

- 1st Battalion, 562nd ADA: Fort Meade, Maryland, 1 September 1958 - 11 December 1962. Previously 36th AAA Battalion, 35th Air Defense Artillery Brigade, Washington-Baltimore Defense Area.
- 2nd Battalion, 562nd ADA: Ladd Air Force Base, Alaska, 11 September 1958 - 30 June 1971 (Nike Hercules, United States Army Alaska)
- 3rd Battalion, 562nd ADA, Suitland, Maryland, 1 September 1958 - 15 December 1961
- 4th Battalion, 562nd ADA: Dallas, Texas (from 15 June 1959), moved at an unknown date to Duncanville Air Force Station, Texas, disestablished 10 February 1969. Under 67th Artillery Group.

Also:

- 5th Missile Battalion, 562d Artillery. The 5th Battalion was activated on 17 March 1960 at Barksdale Air Force Base, Louisiana (organic elements constituted 1 February 1960 and activated 17 March 1960). Battalion inactivated 25 March 1966 at Barksdale Air Force Base, Louisiana. Redesignated 1 September 1971 as the 5th Missile Battalion, 562d Air Defense Artillery. Redesignated 1 May 1972 as the 5th Battalion, 562d Air Defense Artillery, and activated at Fort Campbell, Kentucky. Inactivated 13 September 1972 at Fort Campbell, Kentucky.
- 6th Battalion, 562nd ADA: United States Army Europe. Inactivated 13 September 1972 in Germany.

== Decorations ==
- Presidential Unit Citation (Navy) Streamer embroidered WONJU-HWACHON
- Navy Unit Commendation embroidered PANMUNJOM
- Philippine Republic Presidential Unit Citation embroidered 17 OCTOBER 1944 TO 4 JULY 1945
