= Richard Jefferies (businessman) =

Australian businessman

- Born: 2 December 1920; Armidale, New South Wales
- Died: 9 October 2013 (aged 92); Toowoomba, Queensland
- Relatives: Managing director AMF Bowling Australia
- Military career
- Allegiance: Australia
- Branch: Australian Army
- Service years: 1939–1945
- Rank: Captain
- Unit: 25th Battalion
- Conflicts: Second World War; New Guinea campaign; Battle of Milne Bay; Bougainville Campaign; Battle of Slater's Knoll
- Awards: Distinguished Service Order

Richard David Keith Jefferies, DSO (2 December 1920 – 9 October 2013) was a decorated junior officer in the Australian Army during the Second World War, and a businessman in the post-war years. He was awarded the Distinguished Service Order as a lieutenant following his involvement in the Battle of Buin Road on 19 March 1945.

After his discharge from the army, Jefferies worked in the movie theatre business in Sydney, was at one point managing director of AMF Bowling Australia, and, from 1972, owned and operated a number of bowling and roller skating businesses across Queensland and New South Wales.
