= Tsutomu Akinaga =

Japanese general

- 秋永 力
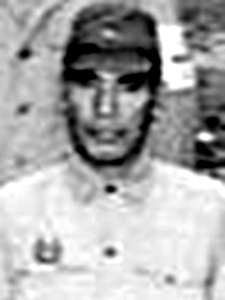
- Born: 20 November 1894; Fukuoka, Japan
- Died: 26 December 1978 (aged 84)
- Education: Imperial Japanese Army Academy; Army Staff College
- Military career
- Allegiance: Empire of Japan
- Branch: Imperial Japanese Army
- Service years: 1905–1945
- Rank: Lieutenant general
- Units: IJA 4th Division; IJA 6th Division; 13th Division; IJA 17th Army
- Commands: IJA 75th Regiment; IJA 57th Division; IJA 6th Division
- Conflicts: Second Sino-Japanese War; Battle of Nanking; Battle of Wuhan; Battle of Lake Khasan; World War II; Bougainville campaign; Battle of Slater's Knoll; Battle of Hongorai River

Tsutomu Akinaga (秋永 力, Akinaga Tsutomu; 20 November 1894 – 26 December 1978) was a general in the Imperial Japanese Army, commanding the Japanese ground forces on Bougainville in the closing months of the war.

== Biography ==
Akinaga was born in Fukuoka Prefecture. He graduated from the 28th class of the Imperial Japanese Army Academy in May 1916, and from the 38th class of the Army Staff College in December 1926, after which he served as a staff officer with the IJA 4th Division.

During the Second Sino-Japanese War, Akinaga was chief of the Maneuvers Section of IJA 6th Division between 1937–1938 and was active at the Battle of Nanking and the Battle of Wuhan. In July 1938, he was promoted to colonel. In December of the same year, following the Battle of Lake Khasan against the Soviet Union, Akinaga was given command of the IJA 75th Regiment where he served until 1940. Akinaga was appointed chief of staff of 13th Division, stationed in China at the start of the Pacific War. Akinaga was promoted to major general in August 1941 and in August 1942 was appointed commanding officer of the Infantry Group of IJA 57th Division stationed in Manchukuo.

As the war situation in southwest Asia began to deteriorate for Japan, Akinaga was appointed chief of staff of the IJA 17th Army, with its headquarters on Bougainville in the Solomon Islands in September 1943. He was promoted to lieutenant general March 1945, and in April became commander of the IJA 6th Division, leading them in operations against Australian forces as they advanced south towards Buin at the south end of Bougainville, with notable battles occurring at Slater's Knoll and along the Hongorai River.

After surrendering, Akinaga was returned home to Japan. He died on 26 December 1978.
