= John Field (Australian Army officer) =

Australian Army officer

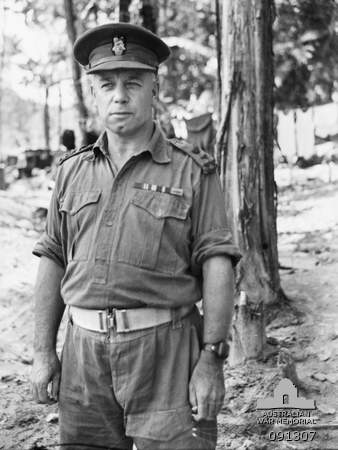
- Brigadier John Field on Bougainville, April 1945
- Born: 10 April 1899; Castlemaine, Victoria
- Died: 12 May 1974 (aged 75); St Kilda, Victoria
- Military career
- Allegiance: Australia
- Branch: Australian Army
- Service years: 1923–1946; 1948–1949
- Rank: Brigadier
- Commands: 4th Brigade (1948–49); 7th Brigade (1942–45); Milne Force (1942); 2/12th Battalion (1939–42)
- Conflicts: Second World War; North African campaign; New Guinea campaign; Bougainville campaign
- Awards: Commander of the Order of the British Empire; Distinguished Service Order; Efficiency Decoration; Mentioned in despatches (2)

Brigadier John Field, CBE, DSO, ED (10 April 1899 – 12 May 1974) was a senior officer in the Australian Army during the Second World War. He commanded the 2/12th Battalion in the Middle East and Milne Force and the 7th Brigade in New Guinea. He later went on to work with the State Electricity Commission of Victoria in large projects at Yallourn and the Latrobe Valley.

== Early life ==
Born on 10 April 1899 at Castlemaine, Victoria, the only son of John Woodhouse Barnett Field and his wife Emily, née Bennett. His father was a colonel in the Citizens Military Force, and in 1910 he became a boy bugler of his father's regiment, the 8th Australian Infantry Regiment. He attended Castlemaine High School and went on to further studies at the Castlemaine Technical School. He was an apprentice to the engineering firm Thompson & Co. Pty Ltd when he was 15 years old, and he went on to become the senior designing draughtsman. He specialised in centrifugal pumps and pumping-plants.

On 11 October 1922, he married Kate Corlett at Castlemaine. On 1 April 1923, he was commissioned in the 7th Battalion, Citizens Military Force as a lieutenant. He was promoted to captain on 10 July 1925. He was successful in an appointment to the faculty of engineering at the University of Tasmania in 1926. He lectured in engineering, drawing and design and also studied part-time for his Bachelor of Education. He continued in the Citizen Military Forces with the 40th Battalion, and was assigned from time to time to the 6th Military District or the 6th District Base. In 1932 he won the army's gold-medal essay competition with his paper, "The New Warfare", in which he wrote about the influence of modern technology on tactics. He was promoted to major on 30 November 1936.

== Second World War ==
With hostilities in Europe, he worked with the 6th Military District on mobilisation plans for Tasmania before joining the Second Australian Imperial Force on 13 October 1939 with the rank of lieutenant colonel. He was placed in command of the 2/12th Battalion and while en route to the Middle East as part of the 18th Brigade he with his battalion was diverted to the United Kingdom to provide additional defences against a feared German invasion, following the fall of France. He disembarked at Gourock, Scotland, on 17 June 1940, before moving to Lopcombe Corner, England. The battalion was relocated to Colchester in October 1940 and left the United Kingdom on 17 November.

Disembarking in Egypt on 31 December 1940, he set about training his troops for desert warfare. In February 1941, the 2/12th Battalion was transferred to the 9th Division. The 2/12th Battalion moved in early April to help bolster the defence of Tobruk and fought until it was withdrawn on the night of 26 and 27 August. After Tobruk, the 2/12th Battalion trained in Palestine before joining the forces garrisoning Syria in late September. He was mentioned in despatches on 30 December 1941. His battalion rejoined the 7th Division in early January 1942 and sailed for Australia from Suez on 12 February arriving at Adelaide on 28 March.

After returning to Australia, he was promoted temporary brigadier on 8 May 1942 and was given command of the 7th Brigade, Citizens Military Force. He was sent to Territory of Papua as the commander of Milne Force consisting of 7th Brigade and all naval, land and air units in the region of Milne Bay, Papua. He and the brigade arrived 11 July embarked in the Dutch ship SS Tasman. He used his engineering experience to help with the tasks of constructing airstrips, roads and camps. He was replaced by Major General Cyril Clowes and returned to command the 7th Brigade. During the battle of Milne Bay he was awarded the Distinguished Service Order, which also acknowledged his leadership of Milne Force. He was also awarded the Efficiency Decoration on 2 September 1943.

In November 1943, the 7th Brigade returned to Australia where it undertook a period of reorganisation and training on the Atherton Tablelands. In early 1944, he and the 7th Brigade were deployed overseas again to Madang, Territory of New Guinea. While being transported in an aircraft in September, the aircraft crashed while en route from Lae to Madang, he and his party trekked for nine days before reaching safety. Transferred to Bougainville Island in November as part of Lieutenant General Stanley Savige's II Corps. He led the brigade during a number of significant battles until the end of the war including the battle of Pearl Ridge and battle of Slater's Knoll. He was appointed Commander of the Order of the British Empire on 21 February 1946 and mentioned in despatches on 15 April 1947 for his part in the Bougainville campaign.

== Later life ==
After the cessation of hostilities, he arrived back in Australia, where he assisted the demobilisation and disposal from October 1945. He was appointed aide de camp to the Governor-General from 11 January 1946 serving in this role until 10 January 1949. He transferred to the Reserve of Officers on 27 November 1949. He took up a position with the State Electricity Commission of Victoria in December as assistant general superintendent for Yallourn Power Station and later became general superintendent in 1951. He retired from the State Electricity Commission of Victoria in 1964.

Field died on 12 May 1974 at St Kilda and was cremated. He was survived by his wife and three daughters.
