= Kesao Kijima =

Imperial Japanese Army major general (1889–1965)

- 木島 袈裟雄
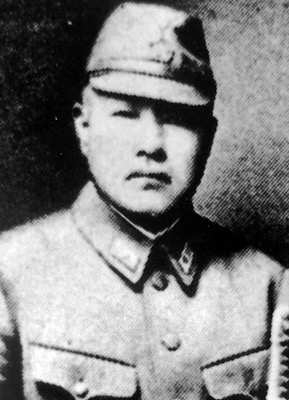
- Born: 20 November 1889; Nagano, Japan
- Died: 10 February 1965 (aged 75)
- Education: Imperial Japanese Army Academy
- Military career
- Allegiance: Empire of Japan
- Branch: Imperial Japanese Army
- Service years: 1911–1945
- Rank: Major general
- Units: 6th Depot Division; Eighth Area Army; 17th Army
- Commands: 123rd Infantry Regiment; 17th Infantry Brigade; 38th Independent Mixed Brigade
- Conflicts: Second Sino-Japanese War; Battle of Wuhan; Battle of Nanchang; World War II; Bougainville campaign; Battle of Pearl Ridge

Kesao Kijima (木島 袈裟雄, Kijima Kesao; 20 November 1889 – 10 February 1965) was a major general in the Imperial Japanese Army, commanding Japanese ground forces on Bougainville in the closing months of the war.

== Biography ==
Kijma was born in Nagano Prefecture. He graduated from the 23rd class of the Imperial Japanese Army Academy in May 1911.

During the Second Sino-Japanese War, Kijima was chief of the Special Operations of the IJA 123rd Infantry Regiment from May 1938. In July of the same year, he was promoted to colonel. Kijima was active at the Battle of Wuhan and the Battle of Nanchang. However, in April 1940, he was demobilized and attached to the reserve IJA 6th Depot Division based in Kumamoto. In August 1940, Kijima was recalled to active status, and posted back as the commanding officer of the 123rd Regiment. Kijima was promoted to major general in March 1943 and was assigned command of the IJA 17th Infantry Brigade. In May 1943, the IJA 17th Infantry Brigade came under the command of the Japanese Eighth Area Army in the Japanese-occupied Solomon Islands and New Guinea. It had its headquarters at Rabaul, New Britain. Kijima was initially in charge of the defenses of western New Britain. In July 1944, Kijima was given command of the IJA 38th Independent Mixed Brigade of the IJA 17th Army on Bougainville Island upon its formation. The brigade fought at the Battle of Pearl Ridge during the Bougainville campaign against the Australian Army, but was defeated on 1 January 1945 after three days. The retreat of the brigade southwards towards Buin was refused, and it subsequently became isolated at Numa Numa until the cessation of hostilities.

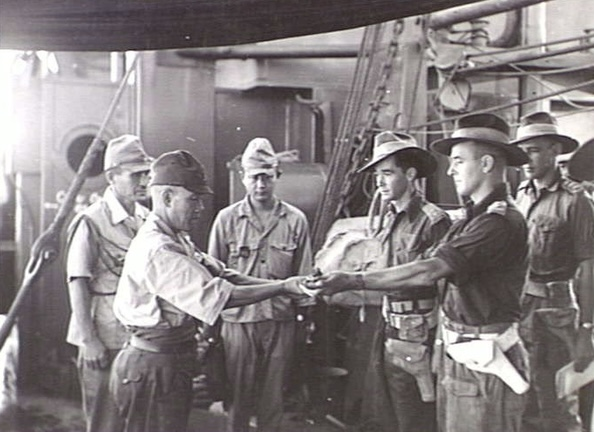
Kijima handing his sword to Captain W. Davies Aboard

Kijima was held by the Australians as a prisoner of war until 1 March 1950, but was not charged with any war crimes.
