= Masatane Kanda =

Japanese general (1890–1983)

- 神田 正種
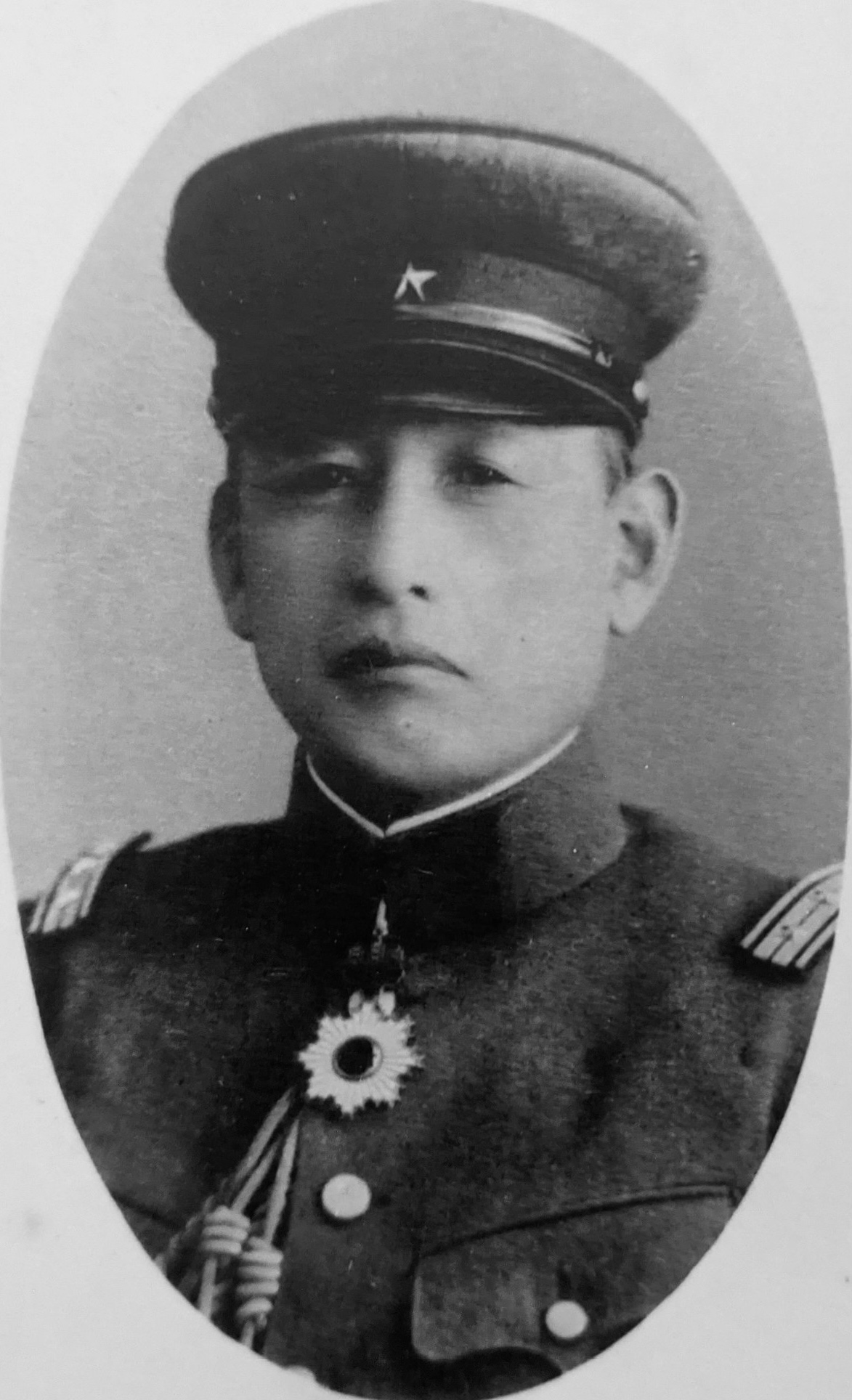
- Born: April 24, 1890; Aichi Prefecture Japan
- Died: January 15, 1983 (aged 92)
- Military career
- Allegiance: Empire of Japan
- Branch: Imperial Japanese Army
- Service years: 1911–1945
- Rank: Lieutenant General
- Commands: 6th Division; 17th Army
- Conflicts: World War II; Bougainville campaign
- Awards: Order of the Sacred Treasures (1st class)

Masatane Kanda (神田 正種, Kanda Masatane; April 24, 1890 – January 15, 1983), was a lieutenant general in the Imperial Japanese Army during World War II.

== Biography ==
A native of Aichi Prefecture, Kanda graduated from the 23rd class of the Imperial Japanese Army Academy in 1911 and was assigned to the Kwantung Army and based out of the South Manchurian Railway office in Harbin in his early career. He graduated from the 31st class of the Army Staff College in 1934. From 1934–1936, he was assigned as military attaché to Turkey. On his return to Japan, he served for a year as an instructor at the Army War College before being reassigned to serve as Chief of the 4th Section of the 2nd Bureau of the Imperial Japanese Army General Staff, where he was (despite his fluency in the Russian language) in charge of collecting and analyzing military intelligence reports from Europe and North America.

With the outbreak of the Second Sino-Japanese War in 1937, he was assigned briefly to be commander of the IJA 45th Infantry Regiment, but soon returned to a staff position as Chief of the 1st Section (and later Chief of the 1st Bureau) of the powerful Inspectorate General of Military Training.

In 1941, he was promoted to Lieutenant general and commander of the IJA 6th Division, which was initially assigned to China, and fought at the Third Battle of Changsha. The division was later transferred to the Solomon Islands from 1943–1945. He was second-in-command of the IJA 17th Army under General Harukichi Hyakutake during the initial period of the Bougainville campaign, and (as lieutenant general) later took command of the 17th Army after Hyakutake suffered a stroke in 1945. Kanda surrendered Japanese forces on Bougainville to Allied commanders on 8 September 1945.

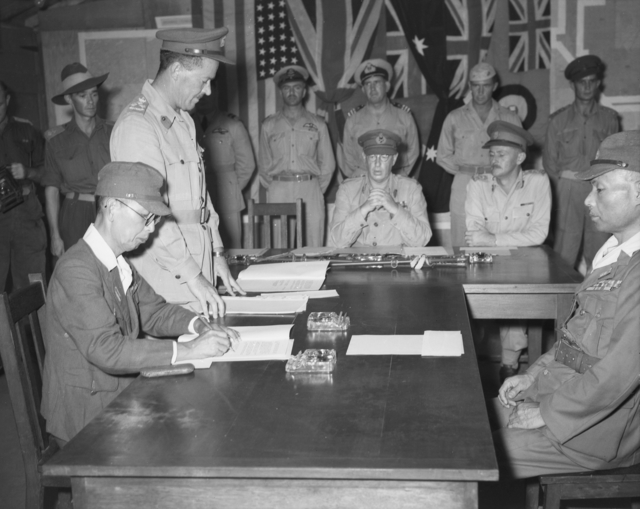
Masatane Kanda (left seated) surrenders Japanese forces on Bougainville to Allied commanders on September 8, 1945

After the war, Kanda was tried and convicted of war crimes by the Allies, sentenced to 14 years imprisonment, and began his sentence in 1948. He served four years in prison, and was released in 1952. He died in 1983.
