= HMAS Warrego =

Two ships of the Royal Australian Navy have been named HMAS Warrego, for the Warrego River in Queensland.

- HMAS Warrego (D70), a River-class torpedo-boat destroyer commissioned in 1912 and serving until 1928
- HMAS Warrego (U73), a Grimsby-class sloop commissioned in 1940 and serving until 1966

== Battle honours ==
Seven battle honours have been earned by ships named HMAS Warrego:

- Rabaul 1914
- Adriatic 1917–18
- Darwin 1942
- Pacific 1941–45
- New Guinea 1942
- Lingayen Gulf 1945
- Borneo 1945
