= Milne Force =

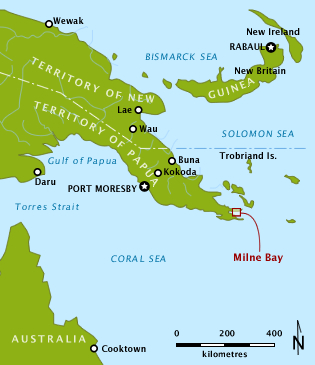
- Location of Milne Bay within the Territory of Papua, 1942. The highlighted area is enlarged below.
- Active: July – 1 October 1942
- Country: Territory of Papua
- Allegiance: Australia, United States
- Branch: Naval, land and air
- Engagements: Battle of Milne Bay

Commanders
- Notable commanders: Brigadier John Field; Major General Cyril Clowes

Milne Force was a garrison Australian Army force formed in July 1942 during the World War II which controlled allied naval, land and air units in the region of Milne Bay, in the Territory of Papua. The force was responsible for constructing airstrips, roads, camps and defensive positions.

Milne Force successfully withheld a Japanese invasion which landed on 25 August during the Battle of Milne Bay and forced the invasion force to retreat on 5 September.

On 1 October 1942, Milne Force was redesignated the 11th Division.

== Commanders ==
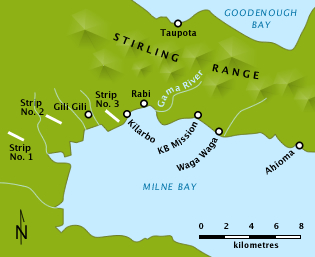
Enlargement of Milne Bay, indicating key locations.

- Brigadier John Field (11 July – 23 August 1942)
- Major General Cyril Clowes (23 August – 1 October 1942)

== Units ==
- 7th Brigade
  - 9th Battalion
  - 25th Battalion
  - 61st Battalion
- 18th Brigade
  - 2/9th Battalion
  - 2/10th Battalion
  - 2/12th Battalion
- 2/5th Field Regiment
- 4th Battery, 101st Anti-tank Regiment
- 6th Heavy Anti-aircraft Battery
- 9th Light Anti-aircraft Battery
- 24th Field Company
- Royal Australian Air Force
  - No. 32 Squadron (Lockheed Hudson)
  - No. 75 Squadron (P-40 Kittyhawk)
  - No. 76 Squadron (P-40 Kittyhawk)
- United States forces
  - 709th US Airborne Anti-aircraft Battery
  - 101st US Coast Artillery Battalion
  - 2nd Battalion, 43rd US Engineer Regiment
  - E Company, 46th US Engineer Regiment
