= XIV Corps (United States) =

- Shoulder sleeve insignia of XIV Corps.
- Active: 1 October 1933–31 December 1945; 25 March 1948–1 April 1968
- Country: United States of America
- Branch: United States Army
- Role: Headquarters
- Size: Corps
- Engagements: World War II; Guadalcanal; Northern Solomons; Bismarck Archipelago; Luzon

Commanders
- Notable commanders: Alexander Patch; Oscar Griswold

Insignia
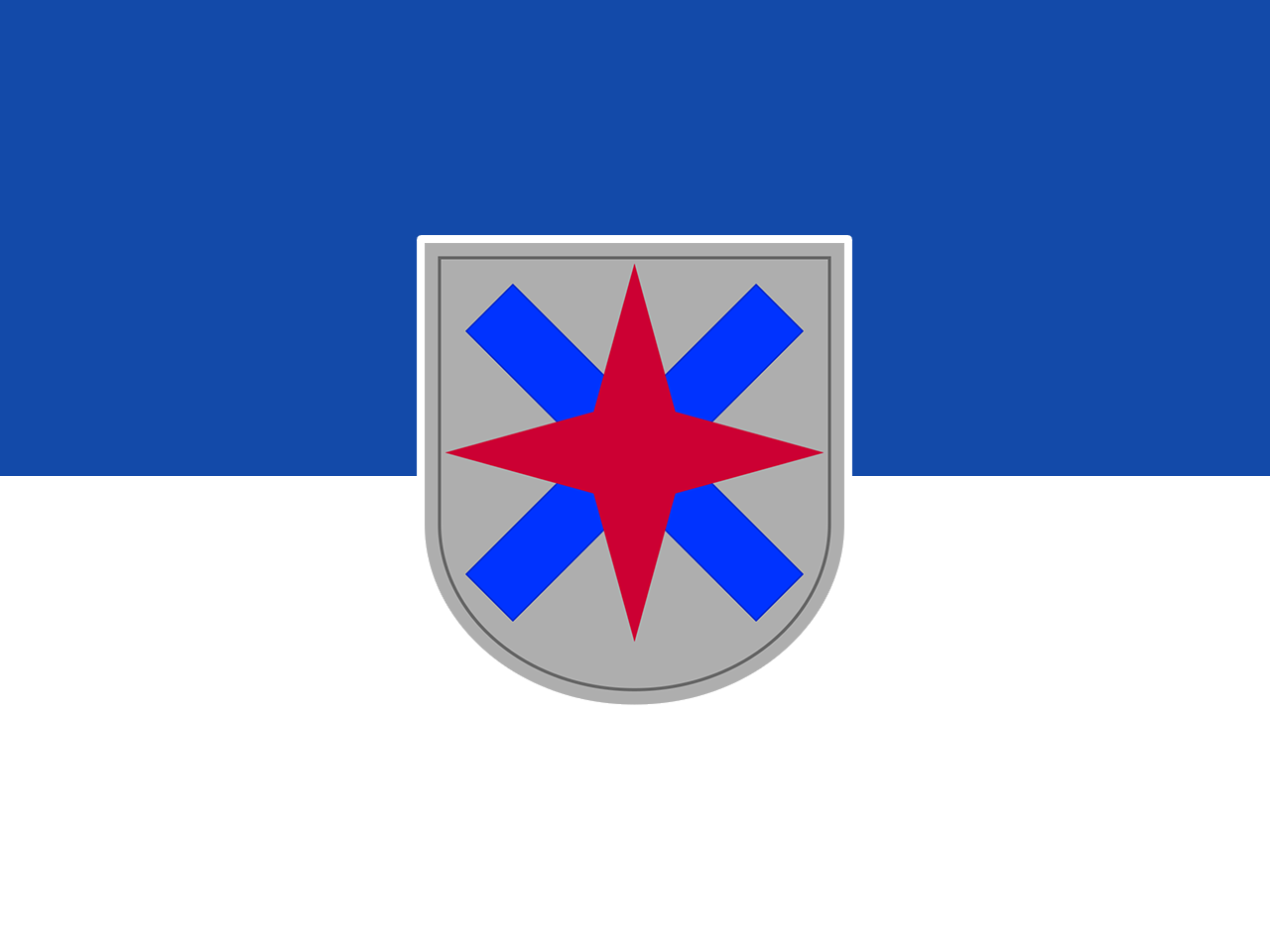
- XIV Corps Flag

XIV Corps was a corps-sized formation of the United States Army.

== Interwar period ==
=== XIV Corps (I) ===
The XIV Corps was authorized by the National Defense Act of 1920 and was to be composed of units of the Organized Reserve located primarily in the Fourth Corps Area. The Headquarters and Headquarters Company were constituted on 29 July 1921 in the Regular Army, allotted to the Fourth Corps Area, and assigned to the Fifth Army. The Headquarters was organized in January 1922 with Reserve personnel at Birmingham, Alabama. The Headquarters Company was organized in April 1923 with Reserve personnel at Birmingham. The Headquarters was withdrawn from the Regular Army on 1 October 1933 and demobilized.

=== XIV Corps (II) ===
The second iteration of the XIV Corps was constituted in the Organized Reserve on 1 October 1933, allotted to the Fourth Corps Area, and assigned to the Third Army. The Headquarters was concurrently initiated at Birmingham, Alabama, with Reserve personnel previously assigned to the demobilized XIV Corps (RAI). The designated mobilization station was Camp McClellan, Alabama, where the corps Headquarters would assume command and control of its subordinate corps troops, which would then be mobilizing throughout the Fourth Corps Area. It was redesignated on 1 January 1941 as Headquarters, XIV Army Corps. The XIV Corps was not activated prior to World War II and was located in Birmingham as of 7 December 1941 in a reserve status.

== World War II ==
The history of XIV Corps in World War II dates from J 1942. Under the command of Major General Alexander Patch from 1 January 1943, the XIV Army Corps directed the American Americal Division and 25th Infantry Divisions, the 2nd Marine Division, and the 147th Infantry Regimental Combat Team in the final drive that expelled the Japanese from Guadalcanal early in February 1943. The 70th Coast Artillery Regiment (Anti-Aircraft) landed on 23 May 1943. From air fields guarded by the XIV Army Corps, Allied aircraft began the neutralization of the enemy's vital Munda airfields on New Georgia.

Major General Oscar Griswold succeeded Patch as XIV Corps commander on 26 April 1943. In a lightning campaign, which began 30 June 1943 with the invasion of Rendova Islands, General Griswold's forces, which included the 43rd (New England) and the 37th (Buckeye) Infantry Divisions with elements of the 25th Division, seized New Georgia and the important Munda airfield on 6 August. Mopping up the adjacent islands was completed and the New Georgia campaign ended on 6 October 1943. American and New Zealand aircraft operating from the Munda field began the neutralization of Kahili and other enemy airfields in Bougainville.

XIV Corps defeated the once fine Japanese 17th Army on Bougainville in March 1944. Part of this army was the Sixth Infantry Division, which was considered Japan's best division in the early Chinese campaigns and played a major part in the Rape of the Chinese city of Nanking in 1937.

In the Bougainville campaign, the 37th and Americal Divisions, and two battalions of the Fiji military forces, were the principal combat units of XIV Corps. Elements of the 93rd (Negro) Infantry Division arrived after the peak of the battle and assisted in harassing retreating Japanese troops. There were 65,000 Japanese on Bougainville when the Americans landed, of whom some 8,200 died in combat and 16,600 from illness.

The three airfields in the Bougainville perimeter were used as bases for allied aircraft that reduced the once mighty Japanese air and naval base of Rabaul, New Britain, to an impotent outpost of the enemy's island empire. The first raid on Truk, a large Japanese air and naval base in the Central Pacific, was staged through Bougainville by Liberators of the Thirteenth Air Force.

From the Solomons campaigns, XIV Army Corps gained the nickname "Kings of the Solomons".

=== Liberators of Manila ===
XIV Army Corps with its initial divisions, the 37th and the 40th (Sunshine) Infantry Division, landed on the shores of Lingayen Gulf, Luzon, Philippines, on S-Day, which was 9 January 1945. The landing was made without ground opposition as the Japanese garrison, completely surprised, fled three days before S-Day at the start of an intensive naval and aerial bombardment.

Meeting sporadic resistance, the corps drove rapidly south towards Manila, capturing successively Binmaley, San Carlos, Malasiqui and Tarlac. At Bamban, the enemy was strongly entrenched in the 40th's sector in the foothills of the Zambales Mountains. Attacking abreast, the 37th and 40th sufficiently reduced the resistance to allow the 37th to continue on to Manila. The 40th was left to contain and exterminate the stubbornly resisting Japanese.

The 1st Cavalry Division from Guimba began a drive to Manila overrunning the towns of Cabanatuan, Santa Rosa and Garapan, and by 1 February 1945, the 37th and the 1st Cavalry were poised north of Manila ready for the battle for the Philippines' capital city.

On 2 February, elements of the 11th Airborne Division made an airborne and amphibious invasion of Nasugbu on the west coast of Batangas Province, 32 miles southwest of the former American naval base of Cavite. This move was to seal off the Japanese forces south of Manila. The 11th, passing to XIV Corps control, began a push toward a junction with columns of the 37th and 1st Cavalry.

On 3 February, the 1st Cavalry entered Manila liberating 3,700 American internees at Santo Tomas and the next day soldiers of the 37th marched into Bilibid Prison freeing 800 American civilians and soldiers captured on Bataan and Corregidor in 1941.

Resistance was quickly reduced north of the Pasig River, but the Japanese fought ferociously in Southern Manila. Forces of the 37th, 1st Cavalry and 11th Airborne joined up in Manila on 13 February. Meanwhile, the 6th (Red Star) Infantry Division joined XIV Corps on 17 February and attacked well fortified enemy forces in the Shimbu Line east of Manila. In an amphibious, air, para-troop, ground assault, elements of the 11th Airborne Division aided by elements of XIV Corps Special Troops, freed 2,100 American internees from Los Banos Prison Camp, 23 February.

Main enemy resistance collapsed with the taking of the ancient walled city of Intramuros on 24 February by the 37th Division. Mopping up was completed in three public building that had been fortified by the Japanese and in Manila Bay, where Japanese has set up defenses in the hulks of sunken ships.

The cleanup of Southern Luzon with the 1st Cavalry and the 11th Airborne comprising major corps units was begun 15 March, and by 20 May the area was declared free of Japanese organized resistance. Then on 1 July, the corps with the 6th, 32nd (Red Arrow), 37th and 38th (Cyclone) Division began the cleanup of Northern Luzon.

== Campaign credits and postwar service ==
XIV Corps is credited with service in the Guadalcanal, Northern Solomons, Bismarck Archipelago, and Luzon Campaigns.

Subsequent to World War II, XIV Corps was active in Minneapolis, Minnesota, from 22 Nov 1957 to 1 April 1968.
