= Seventeenth Army (Japan) =

Japanese Seventeenth Army
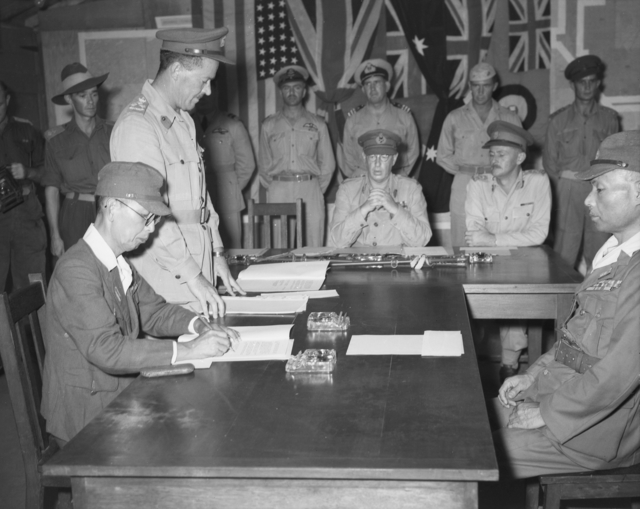
- Seventeenth Army commander General Kanda surrenders Japanese forces on Bougainville at the conclusion of World War II
- Active: May 18, 1942 – August 15, 1945
- Country: Empire of Japan
- Branch: Imperial Japanese Army
- Type: Infantry
- Size: Corps
- Garrison/HQ: Rabaul
- Nicknames: Oki (沖, Offshore)
- Engagements: Solomon Islands campaign

The Japanese 17th Army (第17軍, Dai-jū nana gun) was an army corps of the Imperial Japanese Army (IJA) during World War II.

== History ==
The army was formed on May 18, 1942 under the Japanese Eighth Area Army of the Southern Expeditionary Army Group for the specific task of opposing landings by Allied forces in Japanese-occupied Solomon Islands. It was initially headquartered on Rabaul and participated in the Guadalcanal and New Guinea campaigns of the South West Pacific theatre of World War II.

After General Hitoshi Imamura took over command of the Japanese Eighth Area Army the 17th Army was responsible primarily for the defense of Bougainville. It was trapped and cut off from reinforcements and re-supply during the Bougainville campaign (1943–45), and was forced to live off the land, hiding in jungle caves for most of the rest of the war.

== List of commanders ==
=== Commanding officer ===
#	Name	From	To
1	Lieutenant General Harukichi Hyakutake	18 May 1942	1 April 1945
2	Lieutenant General Masatane Kanda	1 April 1945	15 August 1945

=== Chief of Staff ===
#	Name	From	To
1	Major General Akisaburo Futami	5 May 1942	1 October 1942
2	Lieutenant General Chuichi Miyazaki	1 October 1942	11 May 1943
3	Lieutenant General Tsutomu Akinaga	11 May 1943	11 September 1943
4	Major General Chikara Akinaga	11 September 1943	1 April 1945
5	Major General Isaoshi Makata	1 April 1945	1 September 1945
