= Parish of Youngareen =

Youngareen is a civil parish in Gipps County, in the Riverina region of New South Wales.

Youngareen is on the Naradhan railway line and a freight services still operates to the station there. The nearest town is the railway junction of Ungarie to the east.

The district is on the traditional lands of the wiradjuri people. John Oxley, explorer and NSW surveyor general, was probably the first European through the Youngareen district. The railway was opened in February 1929.
