= Naradhan railway line =

Railway line in Australia

The Naradhan railway line is a railway line in south-western New South Wales, Australia. It branches from Ungarie on the Lake Cargelligo line and heads in a westerly direction, passing through Youngareen and Kikoira, to the small town of Naradhan. The line opened on 11 February 1929 to open up the region for agriculture, and is currently used for seasonal grain haulage. The line saw passenger services until 1974.

A 1929 proposal to extend the line to Monia Gap was never actioned.

== Passenger Services ==
From the opening of the railway a tri-weekly passenger service operated in each direction. The service was a mixed passenger and goods train leaving Ungarie on Mondays, Wednesdays and Fridays at 1:20 pm, and leaving the terminus, Naradhan, on Tuesdays, Thursdays, and Saturdays at 9:06 am. Naradhan branch line trains connected at Ungarie with the Lake Cargelligo to West Wyalong services, and those trains connected at West Wyalong with the mail trains to Sydney. Passenger services ceased in 1975. Today it is served by seasonal grain trains.

== Stations ==
Station Name	Date opened	Date closed	Photograph
Ungarie	11 Feb 1929	Still operating	Ungarie rail yard
Youngareen	11 Feb 1929	4 May 1975	
Thulloo	11 Feb 1929	4 May 1975	
Kikoira	11 Feb 1929	4 May 1975	Line at Kikoira
Gubbata	11 Feb 1929	4 May 1975	The line at Gubbata
Hannan	11 Feb 1929	4 May 1975	
Naradhan	11 Feb 1929	4 May 1975	Naradhan station
