= Gubbata =

- Town
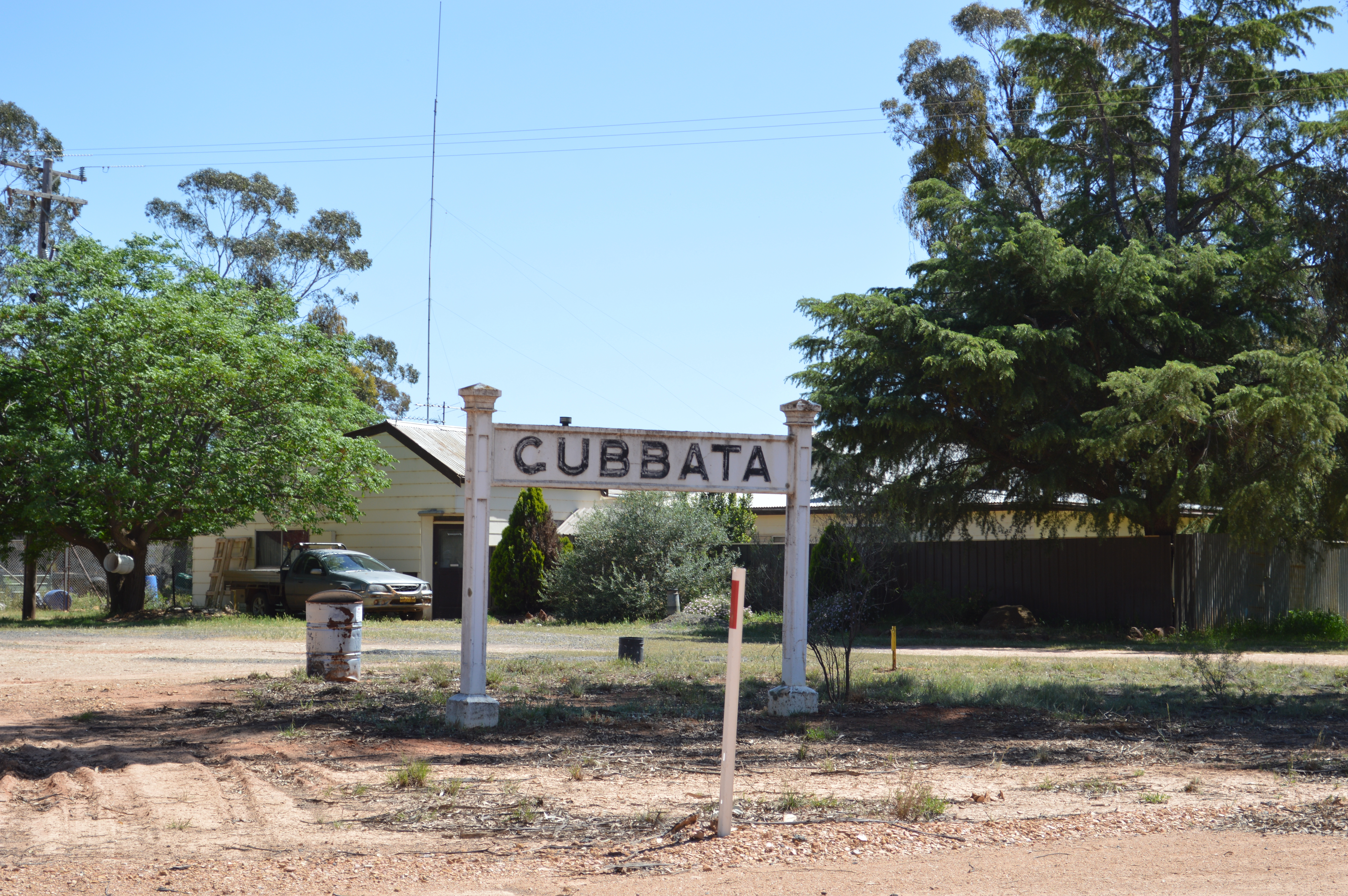
- The platform sign from the former Gubbata station

- Coordinates: 33°38′0″S 146°33′0″E
- Country: Australia
- State: New South Wales
- LGA: Bland Shire
- Location: 432 km (268 mi) W of Sydney; 48 km (30 mi) S of Lake Cargelligo; 84 km (52 mi) WNW of West Wyalong

Government
  - State electorate: Cootamundra
  - Federal divisions: Parkes; Farrer
- Postcode: 2669
- County: Dowling
- Parish: Blairgowrie

Gubbata is a locality in the Central West region of New South Wales. The locality is in the Bland Shire local government area 432 kilometres (268 mi) west of the state capital, Sydney.

The area now known as Gubbata, lies on the traditional lands of the Wiradjuri people. The name, Gubbata, is most likely a settler rendering of an Aboriginal language word.

The village of Gubbata was proclaimed in December 1930, around the time that the surrounding area was opened up for farming and the railway line was opened. Some of the new farming blocks were reserved for soldier settlers. It never grew to the expectations held for it in the early 1930s, Nonetheless, there was a small settlement established there.

It is on the Naradhan Railway Line. The station opened on 11 February 1929 and closed to passengers on 4 May 1975. There was a siding with a loading bank, but the nearest bulk grain silo was built adjacent to the next station, at Kikoira, in 1933.

Gubbata had a public school, from June 1934 to 1946, and again, from September 1961 to February 1983. It also had a post office, by 1934, which closed on 31 July 1981. Like many small communities, it had a public hall.

Mines in the area included two underground gold mines, the Blairgowrie Mine and the Gubbata Mine just off the Naradhan Road. However, the discovery of tin nearer to the neighbouring village of Kikoira, in 1938, led to that village becoming a larger and longer-lasting settlement than Gubbata. Little now remains of the village.

As the village was surveyed and only partially settled, the native scrub in the village reserve was left largely intact while the surrounding area was cleared for agriculture. This remnant area is the basis of the Gubbata Nature Reserve. The reserve is dominated by pointed mallee, congoo mallee and yorrel. Some spinifex and scrub cypress are also present. "The reserve is managed to maintain the sample of mallee habitats in an area that is largely cleared, which requires minimal visitation."

Gubbata's highest recorded temperature is 46.2°C and its lowest -4.8 °C. Rainfall is between 30 millimetres (1.2 in) and 40 millimetres (1.6 in) year round., and an altitude of about 204 metres (669 ft) above sea level.
