= Kikoira =

- Town
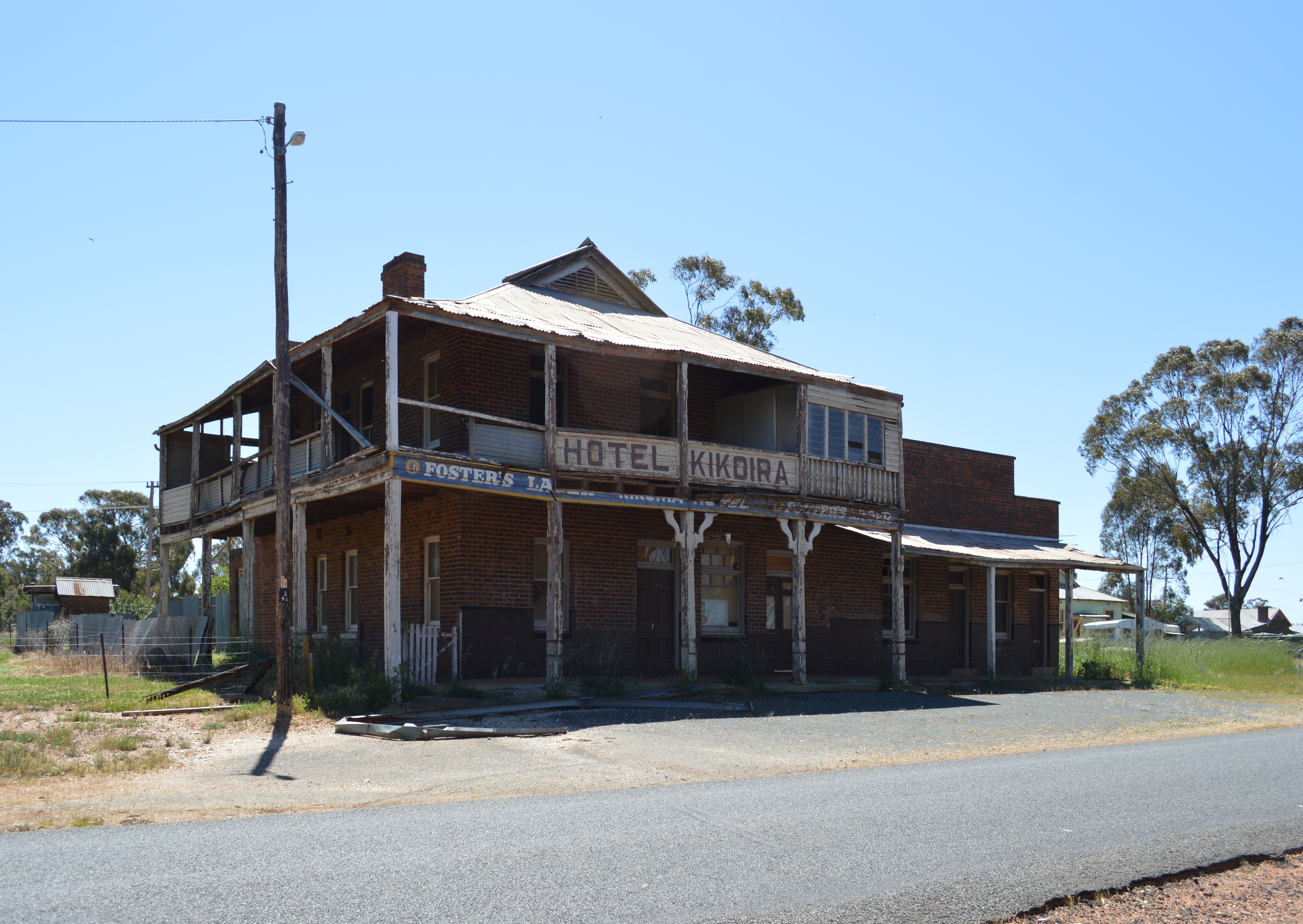
- Kikoira Hotel, now closed

- Coordinates: 33°38′0″S 146°39′0″E
- Country: Australia
- State: New South Wales
- LGA: Bland Shire
- Location: 548 km (341 mi) W of Sydney; 128 km (80 mi) NE of Griffith; 65 km (40 mi) SE of Lake Cargelligo

Government
  - State electorate: Cootamundra
  - Federal division: Parkes

Population
  - Total: 60 (SAL 2021)
- Postcode: 2669

Kikoira is a town in the Central West region of New South Wales, Australia. The town is in the Bland Shire local government area 548 kilometres (341 mi) west of the state capital, Sydney.

The Kikoira area produces wheat and wool and between 1939 and 1970 was home to one of Australia's largest tin deposits.

== Settlement ==
The Kikoira area was set apart for soldier settlement after World War I. The railway came to Kikoira in 1929 with the completion of the Naradhan railway line. Homestead farms along the railway line were available for sale to "farmer's sons, wheatgrowers and landseekers generally" later that year. By 1931, the district had a rugby league team and a subsidised school had been established. The New South Wales government built a 60,000 bushel silo for bulk handing of wheat at Kikoira in 1933.

By around 1933, the first houses were established in the township and a public telephone was installed. The Bank of New South Wales established a branch in the town in 1935 and a bush nursing hospital was built the following year. The Sydney Morning Herald reported in 1937 that Kikoira–with neighbouring Ungarie, Tullibigeal and Weethalle–was experiencing a "building boom". An Australian rules football team was formed in 1938. The New South Wales Department of Education established a public school in the town in 1939.

== Tin mining ==
In 1938, John Gibson, a gold miner and prospector at nearby Weethalle, arrived at Kikoira in search of more gold. Instead of gold, Gibson found a rich tin deposit. Gibson quickly developed a mine and by October that year, the mine was employing 21 workers. A "mild rush" ensued with a large area around Kikoira pegged for mining claims by March 1939.

The mine continued to grow and in 1940 it was employing 140 workers, producing more tin than any field in Australia outside of Tasmania. The Sydney Morning Herald described the shanty town that grew up alongside what was called the Gibsonvale mine as a "scene unknown since the gold rush days". The settlement near the mine was known as Gibsonvale. Miners who staked early claims became wealthy while other miners and their families were living in crude humpies made of bark and wheat bags. The mining activity saw a "boom" in trade in Kikoira. Victoria Cross winner Reg Rattey was working at the Gibsonvale mine when World War II broke out.

Mining continued into the 1960s and 1970s. An alluvial tin treatment plant was built at Gibsonvale in 1968. The plant was designed to produce 35 long tons (36 t) of tin concentrate per month and had an estimated life of five years based on tin reserves on site.

Mines in the area included:

- The Hills Mine a tin mine:
- The Blairgowrie Mine is an underground gold mine.
- The Blackfellow Mine is an underground tin mine on Naradhan Rd
- Gibsonvale Kikoira Mine is an open cut tin and underground tin off Naradhan Rd
- Christmas Gift Mine is an open cut and underground tin mine just off the Kikoira Road

== Today ==
Kikoira station closed in 1975. GrainCorp continues to run a grain receival point in the town. The Kikoira Hotel closed in 1990.
