= Ungarie =

- Town
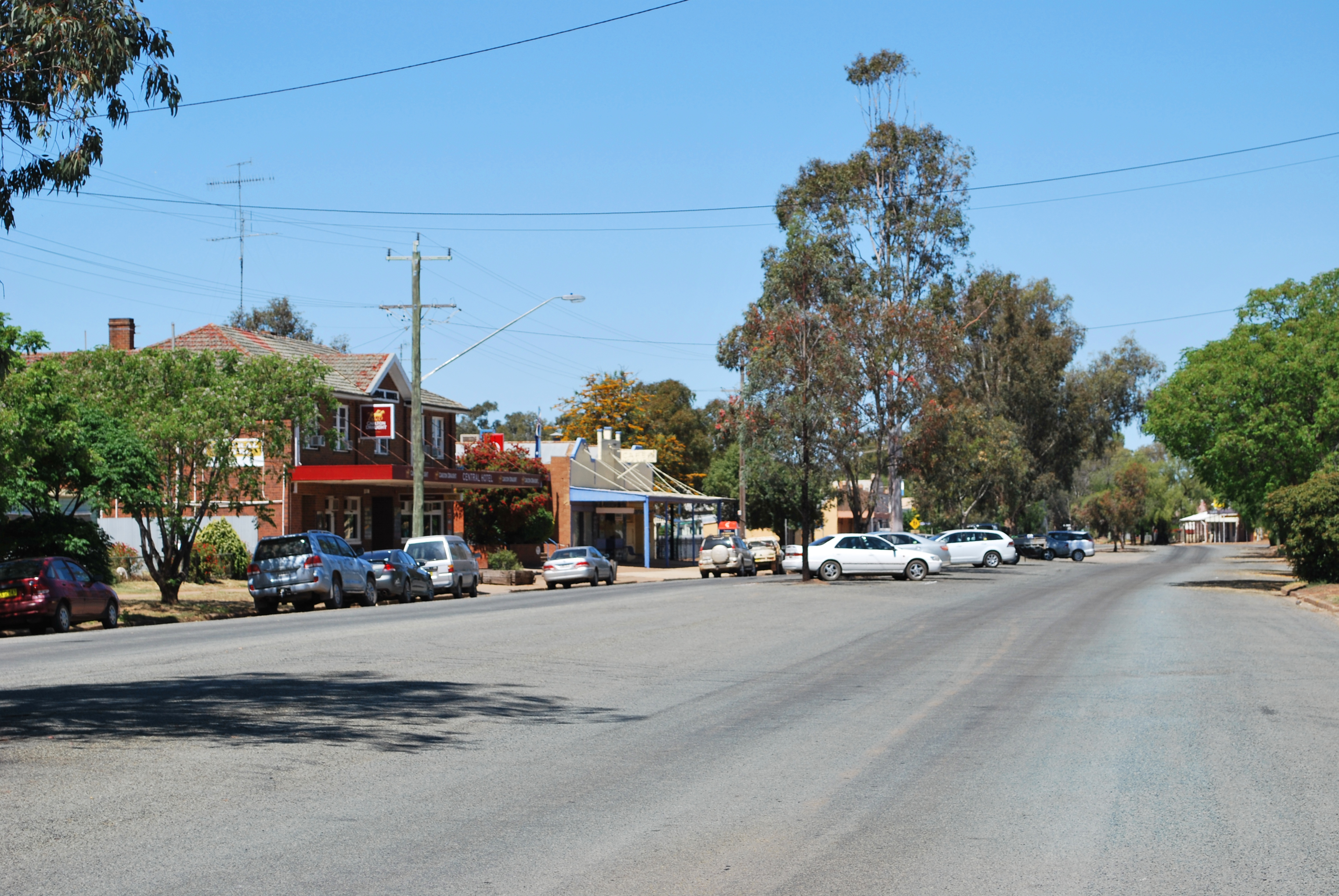
- Wollongough St, the main street of Ungarie

- Coordinates: 33°38′0″S 146°58′0″E
- Country: Australia
- State: New South Wales
- LGA: Bland Shire Council
- Location: 513 km (319 mi) W of Sydney; 615 km (382 mi) N of Melbourne; 200 km (120 mi) N of Wagga Wagga; 44 km (27 mi) NW of West Wyalong
- Established: 1872

Government
  - State electorate: Cootamundra
  - Federal division: Parkes
- Elevation: 372 m (1,220 ft)

Population
  - Total: 396 (2021 census)
- Postcode: 2669

Ungarie /ʌŋˈɡɛəri/ is a town in New South Wales, Australia which is the second major town of the Bland Shire, located in the Central West region of New South Wales. It is located 513 kilometres (319 mi) west of Sydney and 615 kilometres (382 mi) north of Melbourne, between the towns of West Wyalong and Lake Cargelligo and is situated 262 metres (860 ft) above sea level. The town's name is derived from an Indigenous Australian word meaning "thigh".

== History ==
John Oxley, explorer and NSW surveyor general, was probably the first European to cross through what is now the Ungarie district. This was part of his investigation of the Lachlan Valley area in May 1817. In describing the country he had penetrated he said:

"For the want of timber, grass and water, this country will never be inhabited by civilised man."

He was proven wrong and the land west of Bathurst soon opened up. It was about 1852 that John Regan explored the back country of what is now West Wyalong in search of more station country. The Regans had a property east of West Wyalong called The Bland. Soon after he continued to explore further west and came upon the creek that he called The Humbug.

His group was so impressed by the land that it was taken up. A Mr Ward entered into partnership with one of Regan's friend, a Mr Wood. They called the new run Merrigreen which consisted of 42,220 acres (170.9 km^{2}). After Regan's explorations more men came to take up various stations.

Wollongough was taken up by Carlo Marino around 1871, followed by the King Family in 1878 and later by John Bros. In 1866 Roger Freeling took up Ungarie Station.

It was around about 1871 that the farming residents in the vicinity of the Humbug took up a petition for a Post Office to be established at Wollongough as they argued that the nearest post office at Marsden was too far away, 81 kilometres (50 mi). The postmaster at Forbes reported that about 20 to 30 residents would benefit from a post office.

Mr George Tout was appointed postmaster on 1 January 1872 with an allowance of ten pounds per annum. The post office closed in 1875 because of some disagreements regarding the cost of the tender for the mail service. There often appeared to be some concern expressed by postmaster Tout regarding the conditions and the viability of the Post office. Once the post office was established a small settlement began to grow.

Mr Tout had erected, at his own cost, an apartment adjoining the post office. It is believed that this was the first building in Ungarie and it was believed to have been located at the rear of Navin's store on the creek.

The old hotel was owned by Mrs Kerwin, and a portion of it, which still stands at the rear of the butcher's shop was the dining room and was built around 1883 by Mr Tout. In 1889 the hotel was sold to the Mackrell family who came here from Wardry, where they conducted a hotel business.

By 1892 the settlement comprised a post office, a hotel, two general stores, a blacksmith shop, a butchery and a boarding house. It was Mr Mackrell who apparently led a group for the establishment of a school in 1891. Even at this stage the Ungarie settlement did not have the distinction of being gazetted as a village and it was in November 1891 that application was made for Ungarie to be established as a village. Following this, Surveyor A. Maitland reported that a village should be surveyed on the south side of the Euglo or Humbug creek in a position which would now be midway between the present township and the original business place adjacent to the east.

Nothing had yet been finalised, so a petition was submitted to the Minister of Lands, urging a survey for a village. Surveyor Roberts reported in December 1892 that a more suitable site existed on the north side of Euglo or Humbug creek opposite the present day township. In September 1893 Surveyor A. Maitland surveyed the village on this site covering an area of 250 acres (1.0 km^{2}). This was gazetted as the village of Ungarie on 31 March 1894.

The first police residence appeared from Yarrandale in 1896, however it is not exactly clear when the first police constable took up duties. The current police house was built in 1995.

By 1900 the village of Ungarie began to grow and a baker shop was added to the list of services provided in the town.

=== Community post office ===
When the postmaster at Ungarie passed away this threatened the viability of the town. Fortunately, the town people took over the operation of the post office. The late postmaster did not have a will.

=== Railway ===
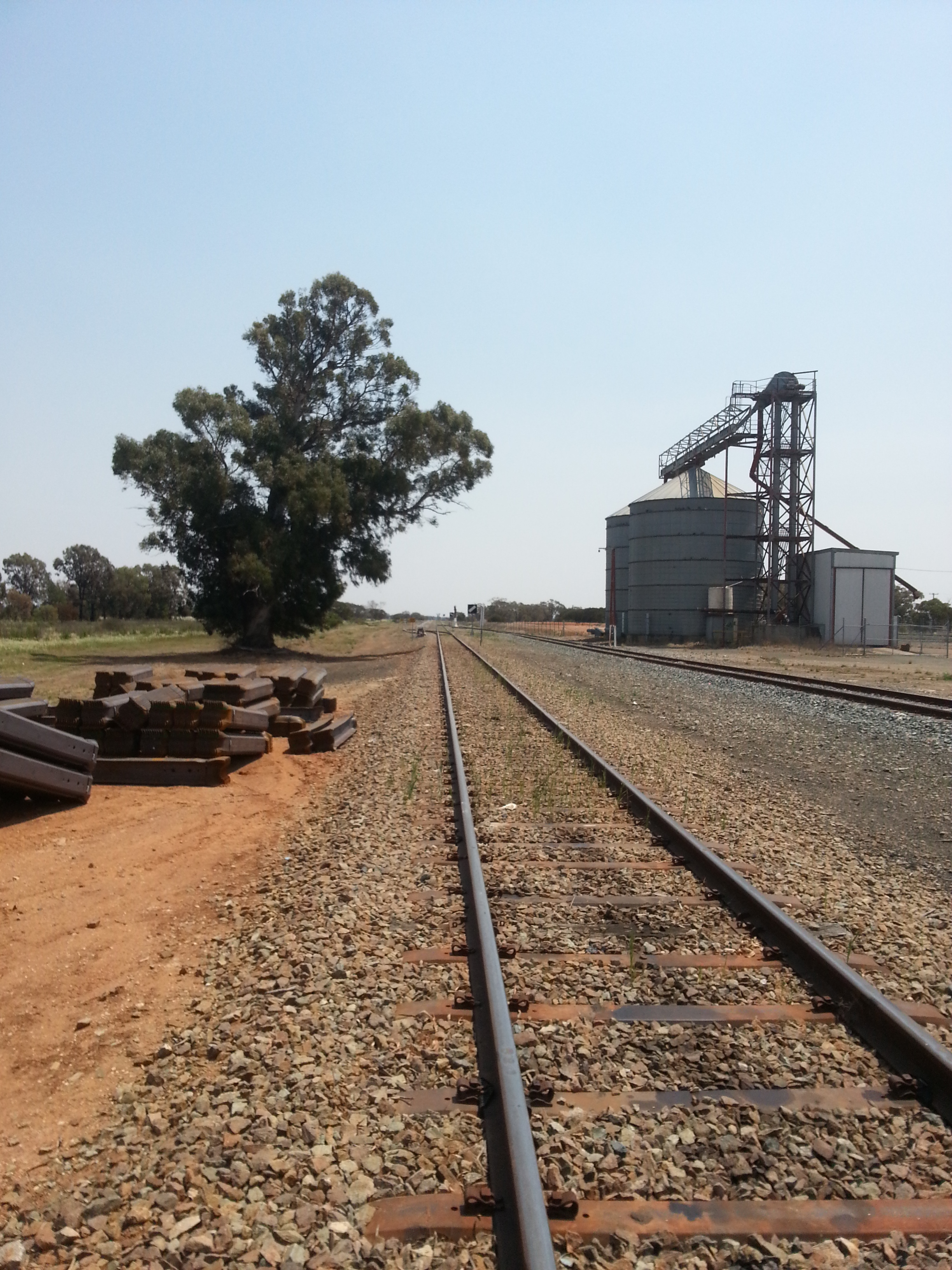
Ungarie rail yard

After considerable agitation from residents a new branch railway line was approved for construction from the existing terminus of West Wyalong to Ungarie and on to Lake Cargelligo. Construction commenced in 1913 with the line opening on 13 November 1917. The new railway station was located approximately one half mile from the original village, a new village eventually grew around the new station. Nine years later work started on a new branch line from Ungarie to Naradhan to service more wheat collection sidings, this line opened on 11 February 1929.

== Present ==
The current village of Ungarie includes a central school, an Australian rules football/cricket ground, a post office, a pub, a butchery, a fuel station, a mechanic, an AGnVET, a swimming pool, a retirement home and a Catholic church.

== Places of interest ==
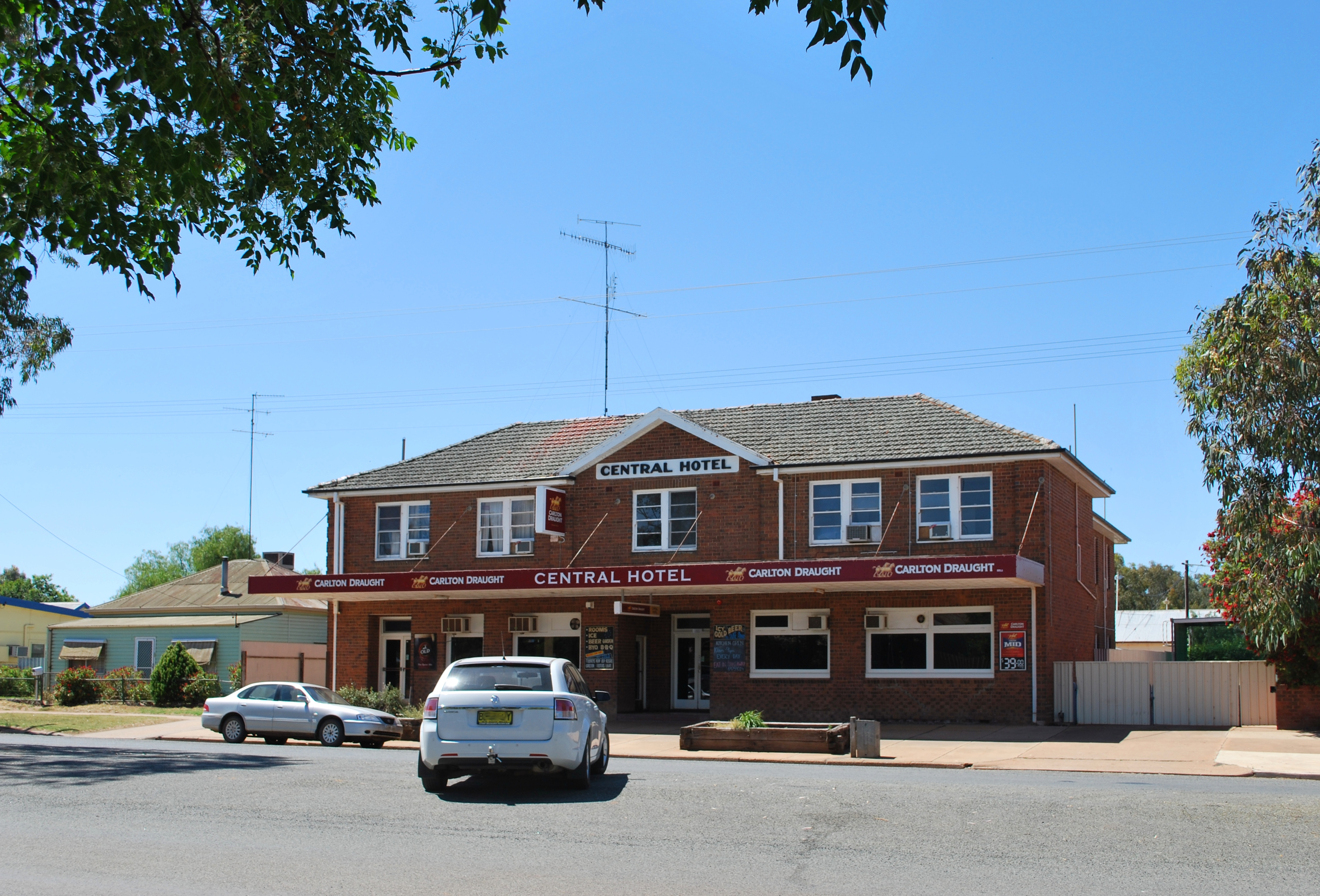
The Central Hotel

- The BIG FOOTY (Celebrating the contribution of the Danihers to AFL)
- White Elephant Water Tower
- Ungarie War Memorial Hall
- Ungarie Lawn Bowling Club
- Central Hotel

== Sport ==
The most popular sport in Ungarie is Australian rules football, despite New South Wales being a largely rugby league supporting state. This is due in part to the legacy of the Daniher Family.

- Ungarie Magpies – Australian rules football & netball
- Ungarie Cricket Club – Cricket
- Ungarie Tennis Club – Tennis
- Ungarie Bowling Club – Lawn Bowls
- Ungarie Swimming Club – Swimming

== Notable people from the area ==
- Anthony Daniher, former Australian rules footballer
- Chris Daniher, former Australian rules footballer
- Neale Daniher, former Australian rules footballer and coach
- Terry Daniher, former Australian rules footballer
- Raymond Boultwood Ewers, war sculptor
- Ben Fixter, former Australian rules footballer
- Paul Smith, actor

== Gallery ==
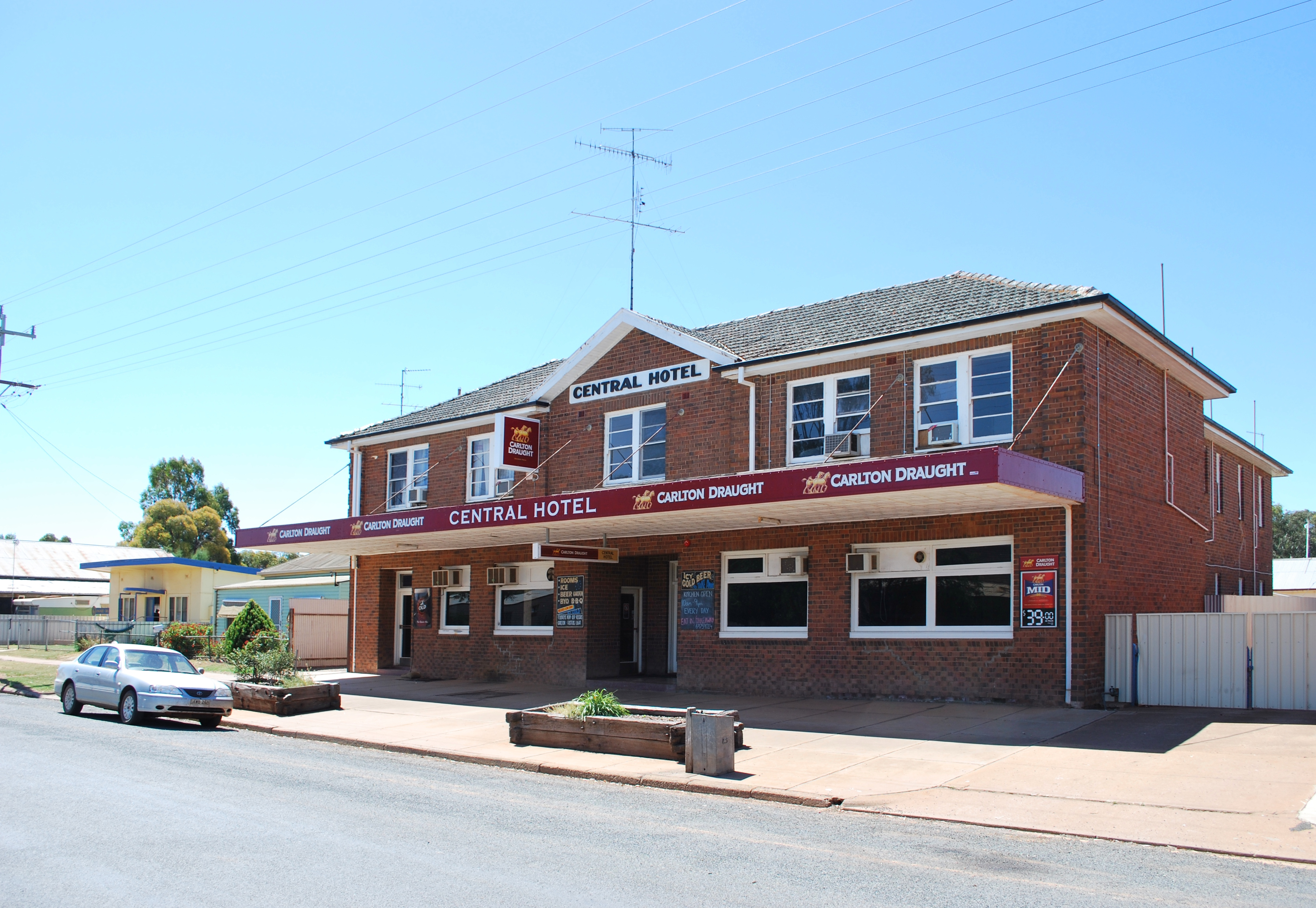
Ungarie Central Hotel

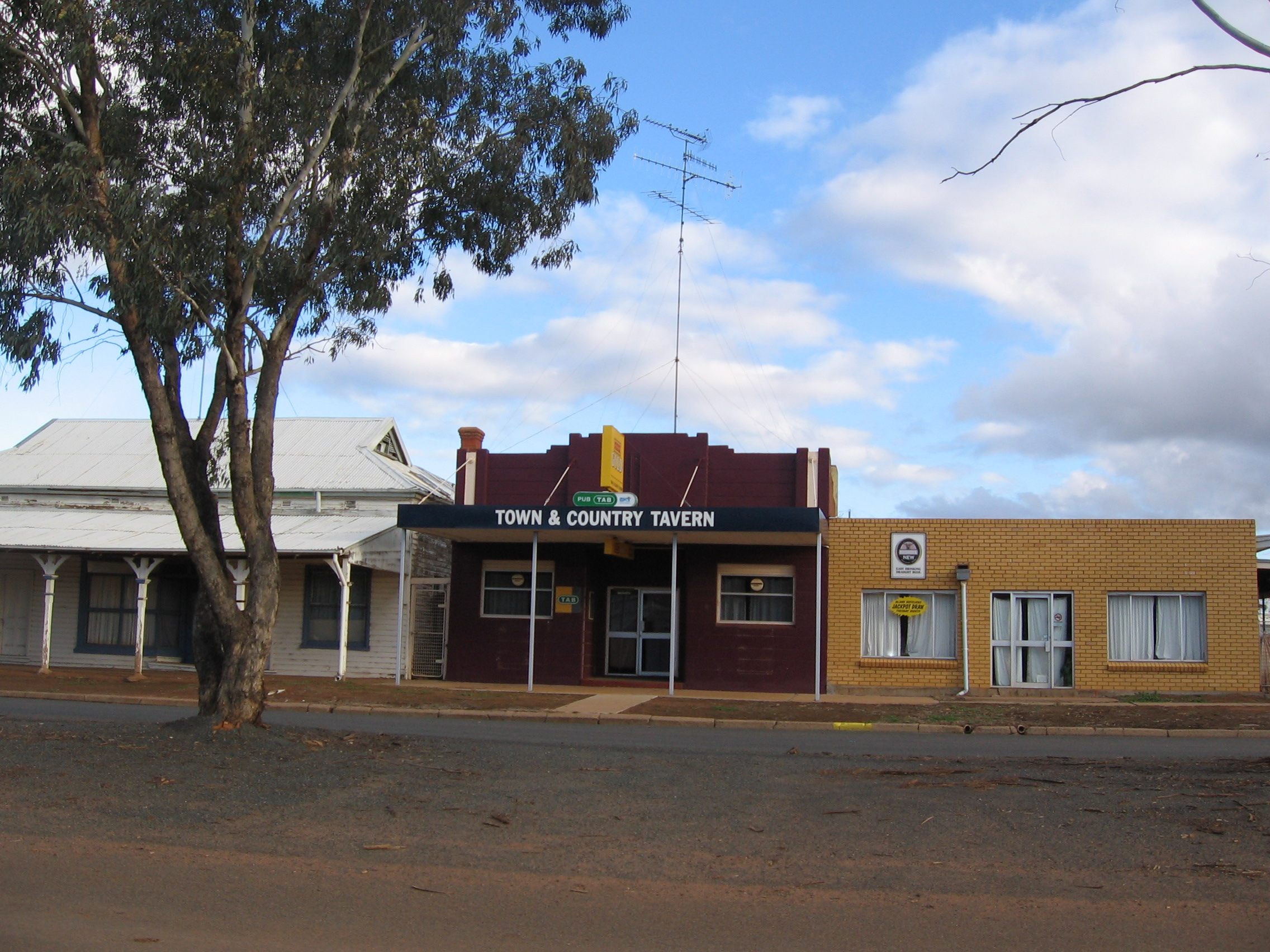
Ungarie Town & Country Tavern

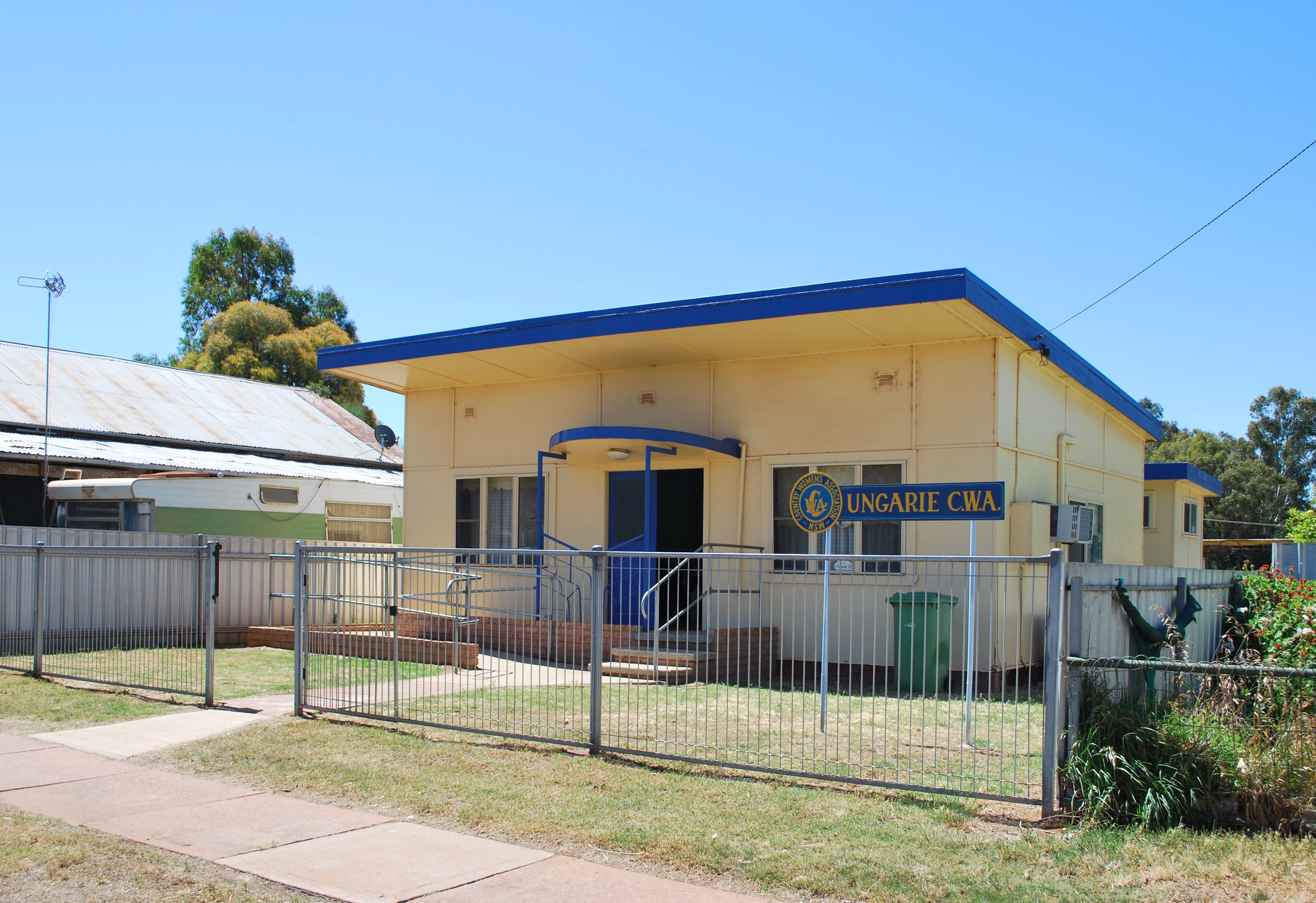
CWA rooms in Ungarie

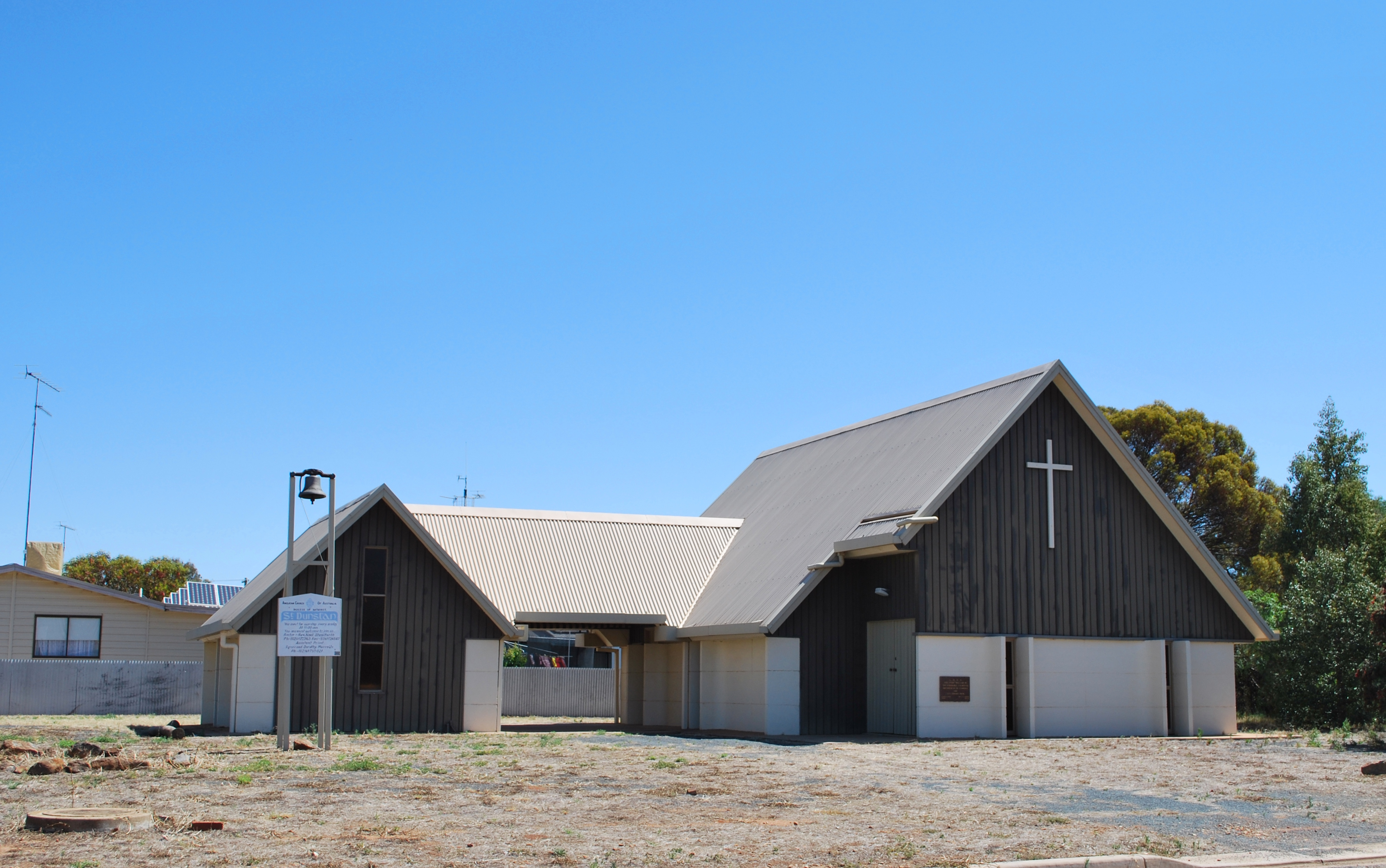
Ungarie Anglican church

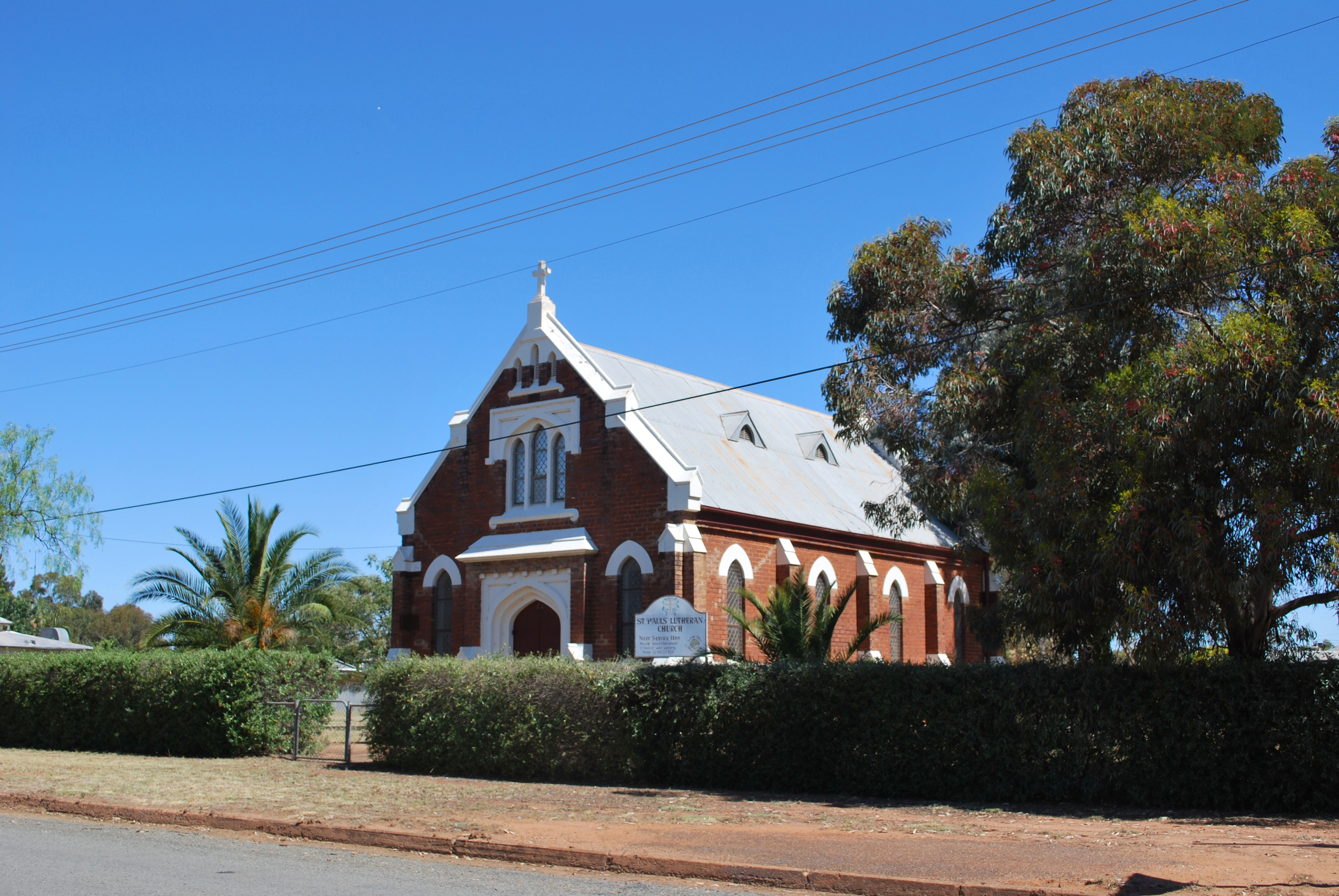
Ungarie Lutheran Church

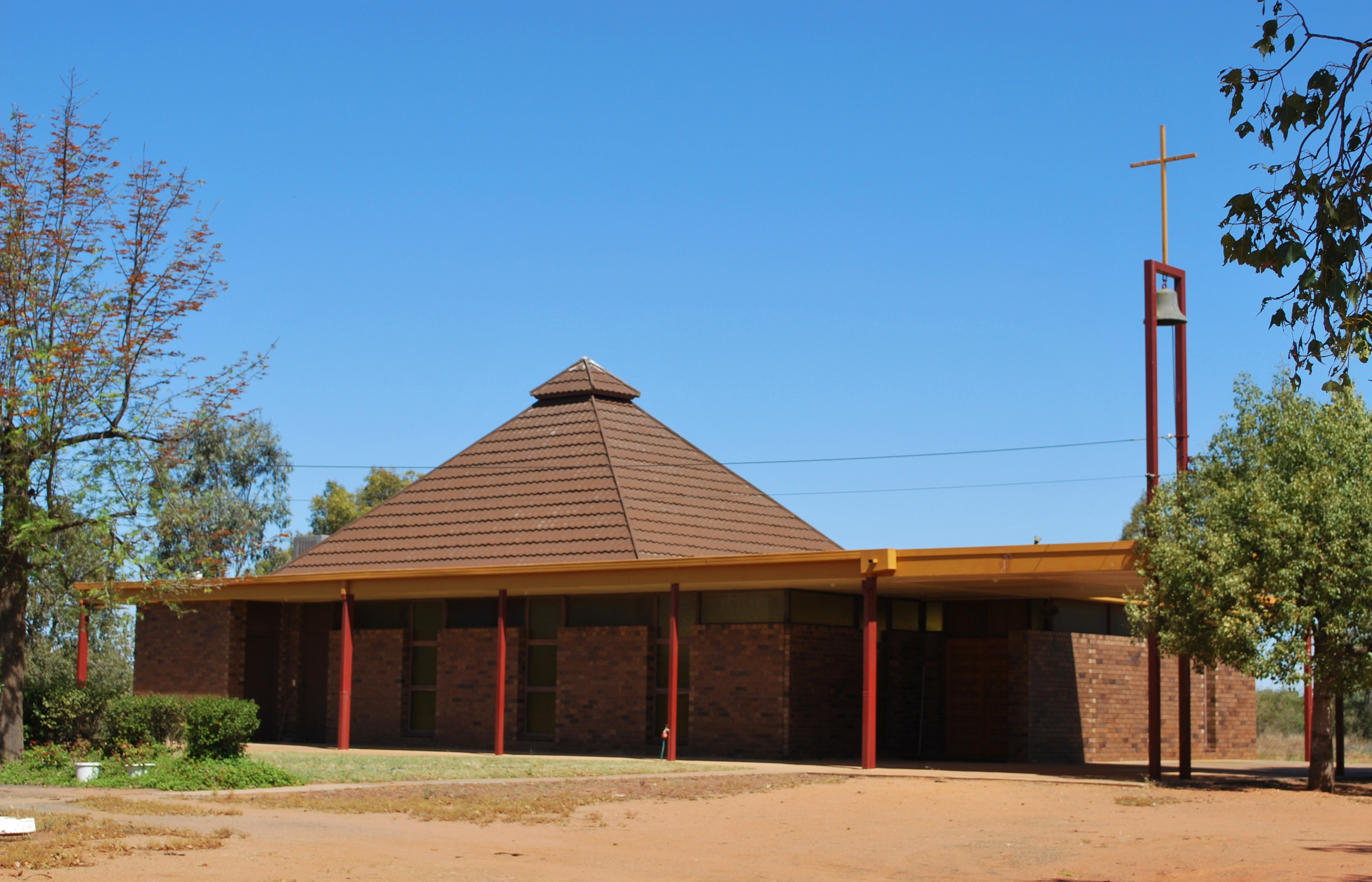
Ungarie Roman Catholic Church

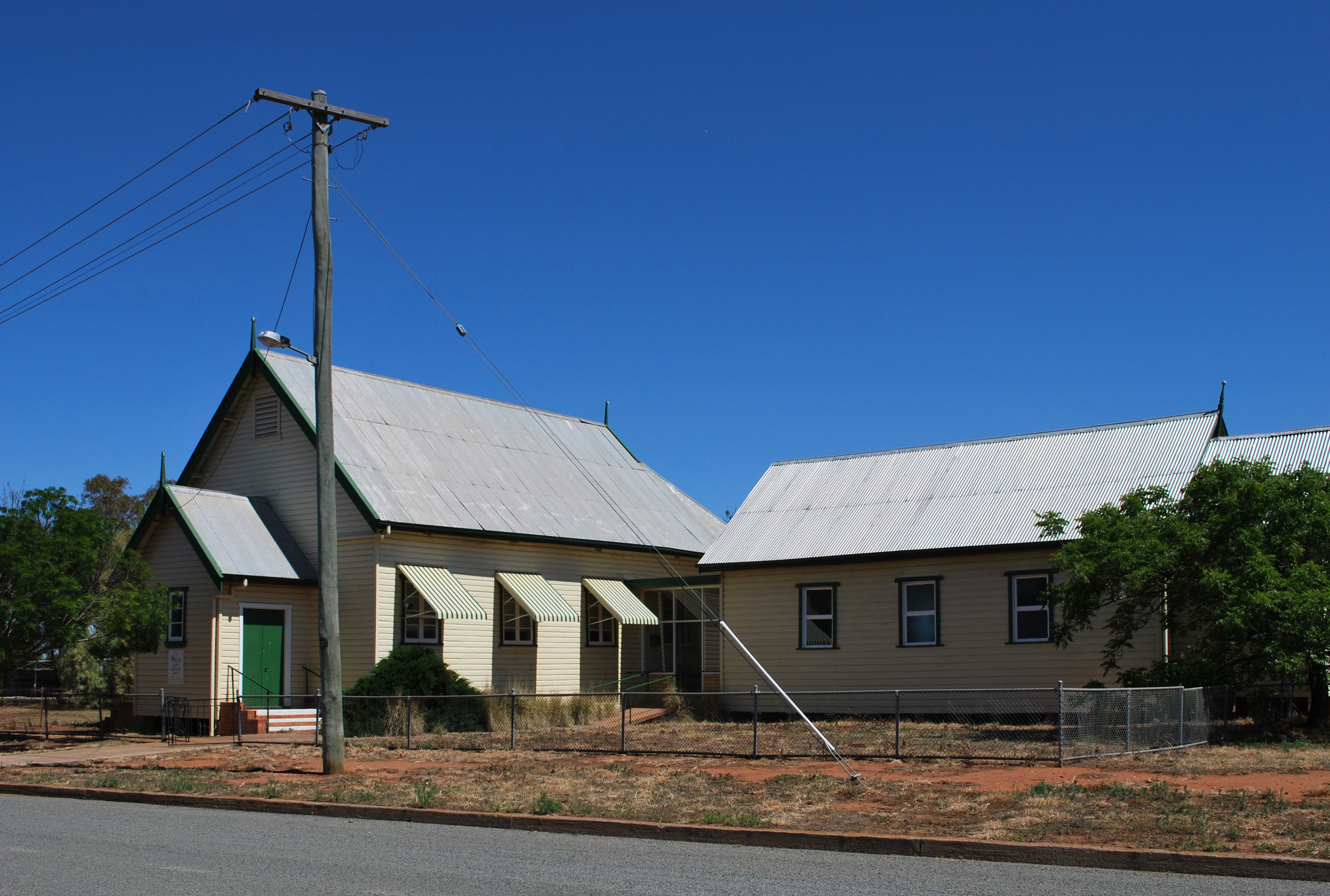
Ungarie Community Church

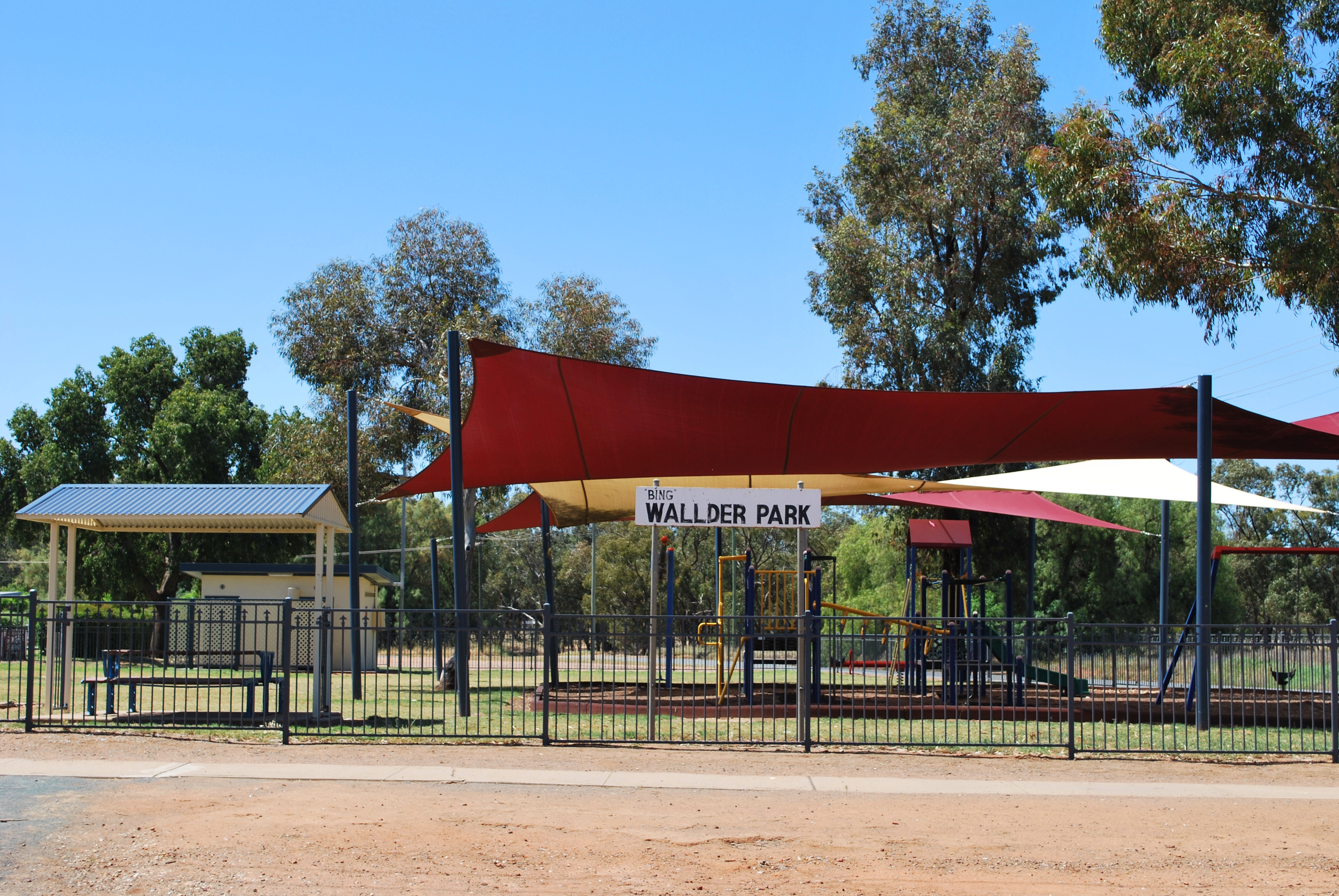
Ungarie Bing Wallder Park

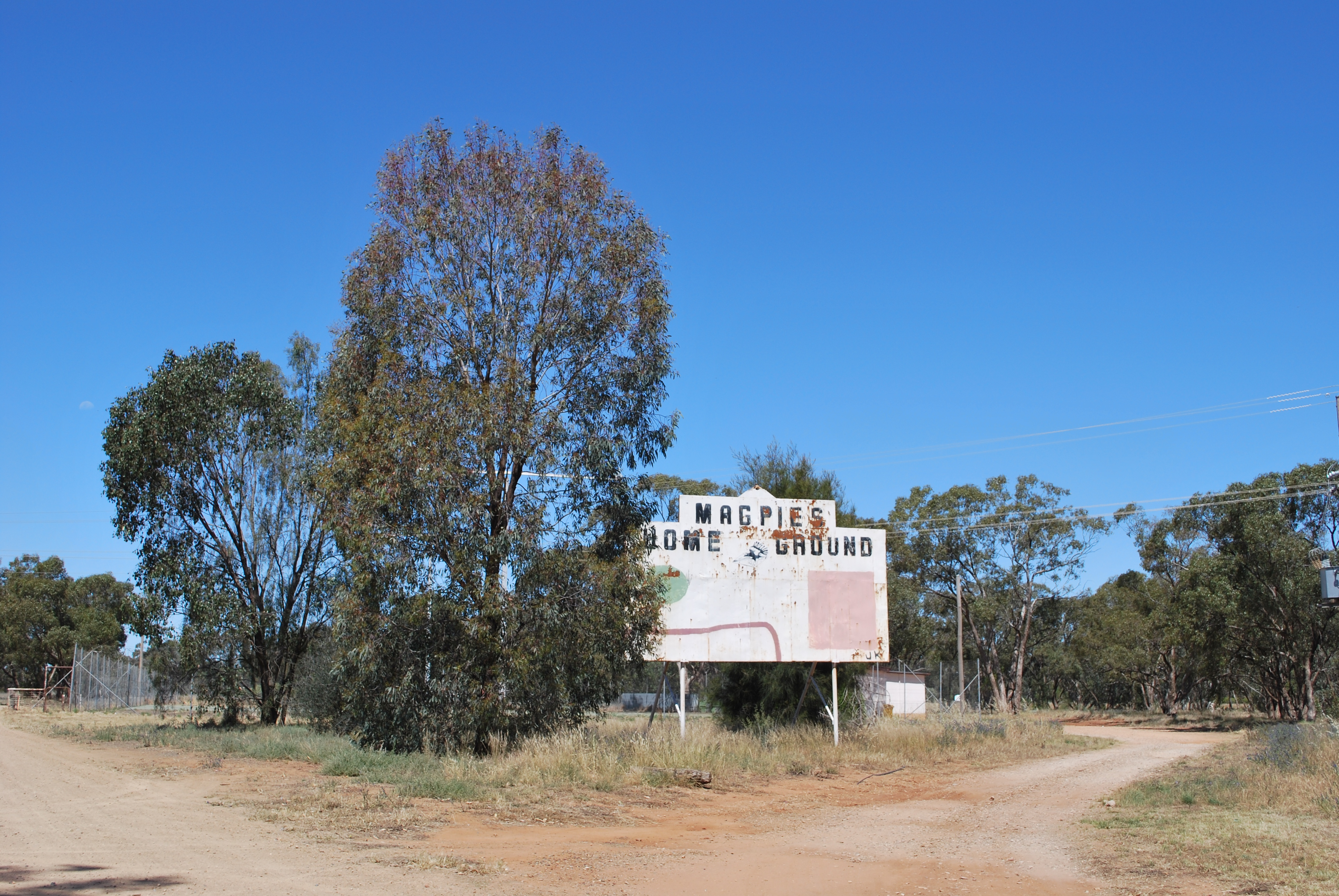
Ungarie Football Ground Entry

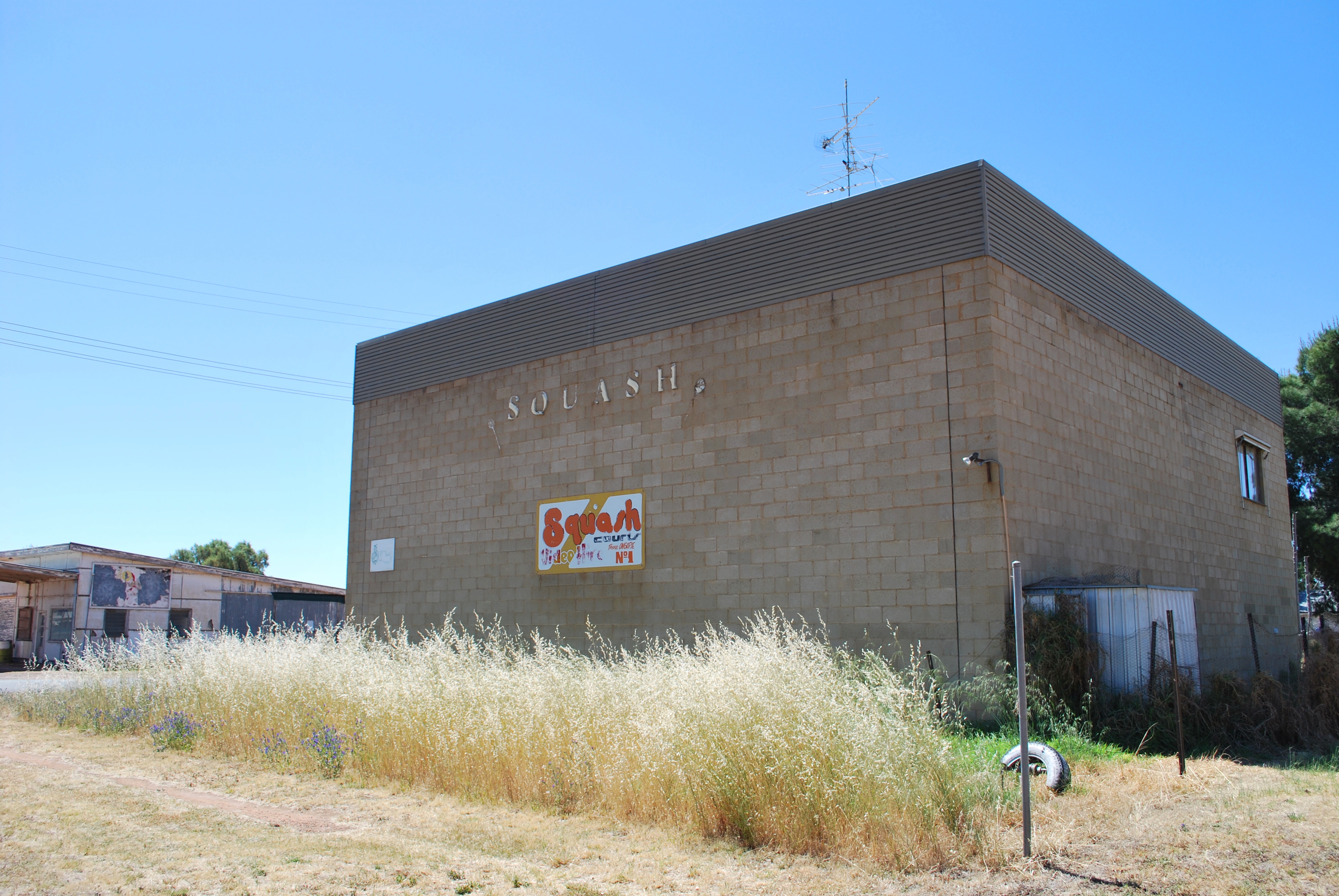
Ungarie Squash Courts

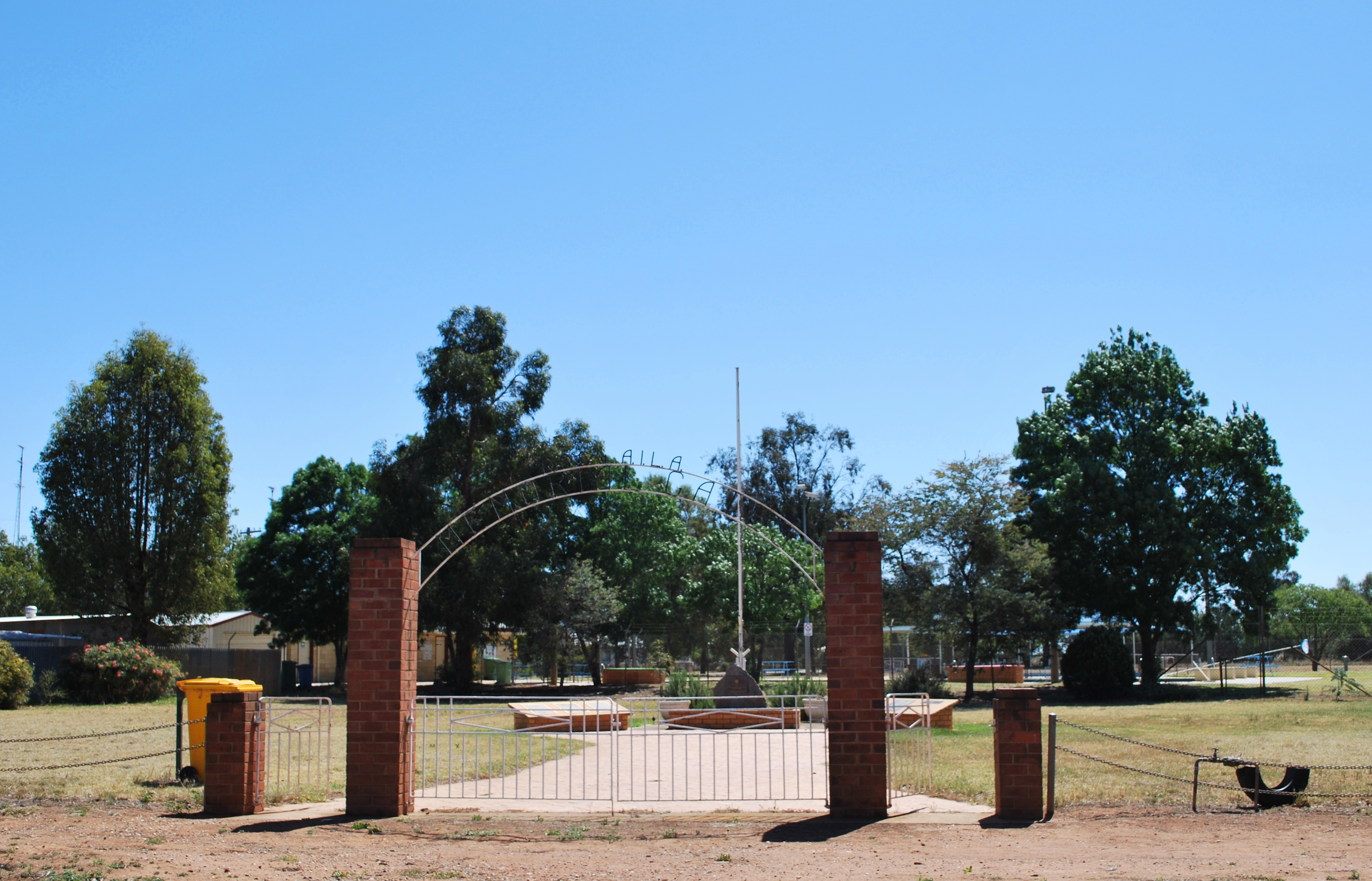
Ungarie War Memorial

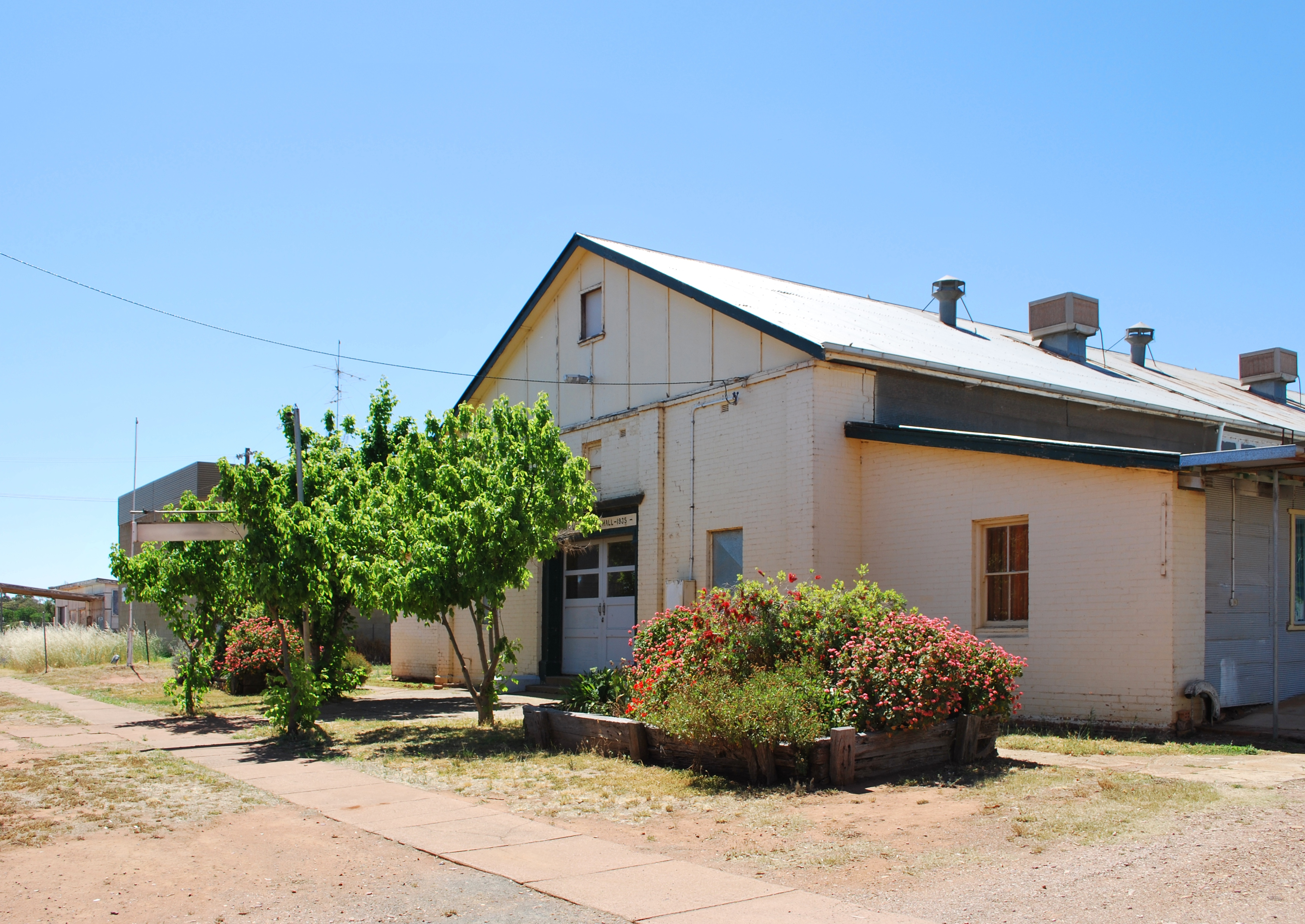
Ungarie War Memorial Hall

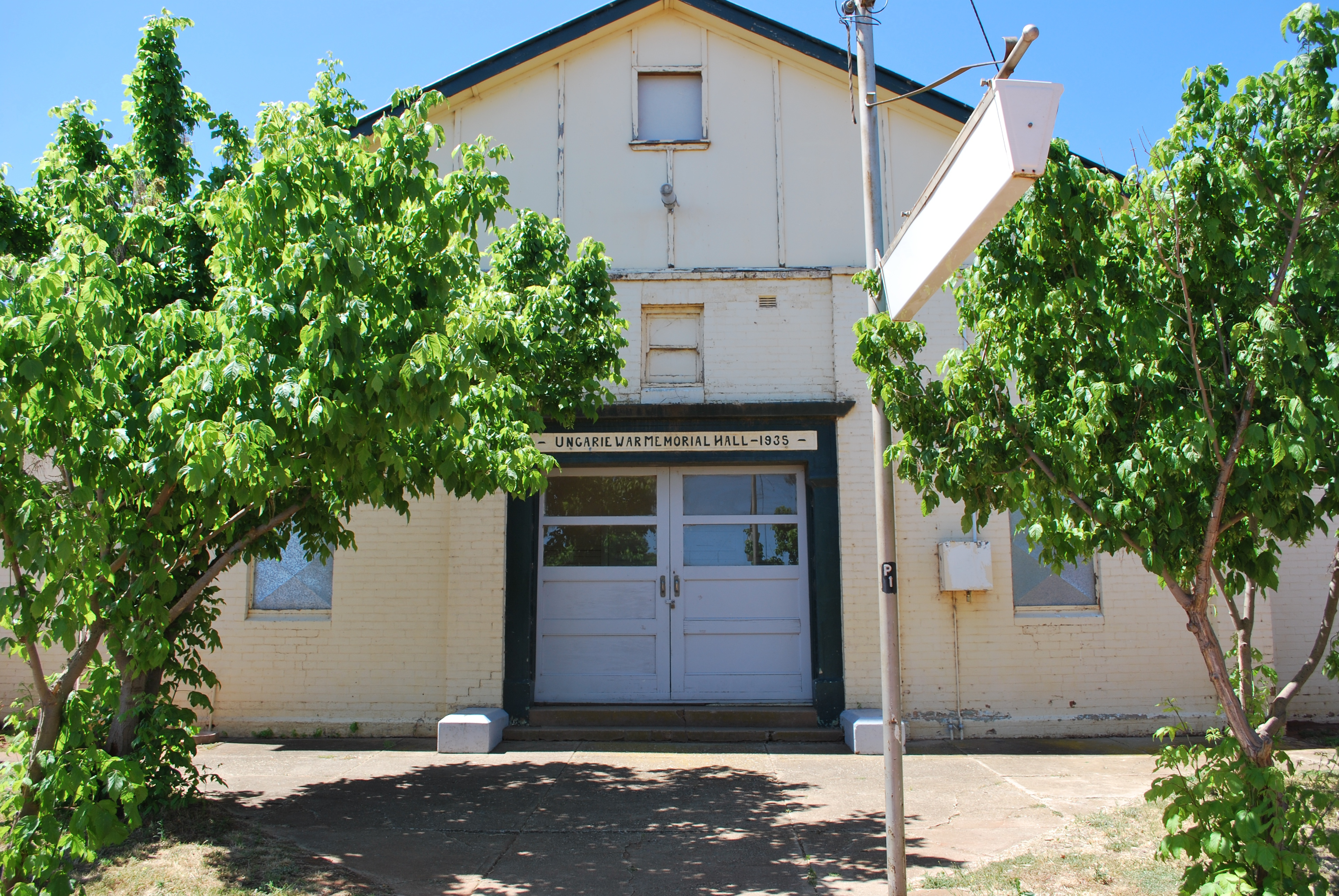
Ungarie War Memorial Hall

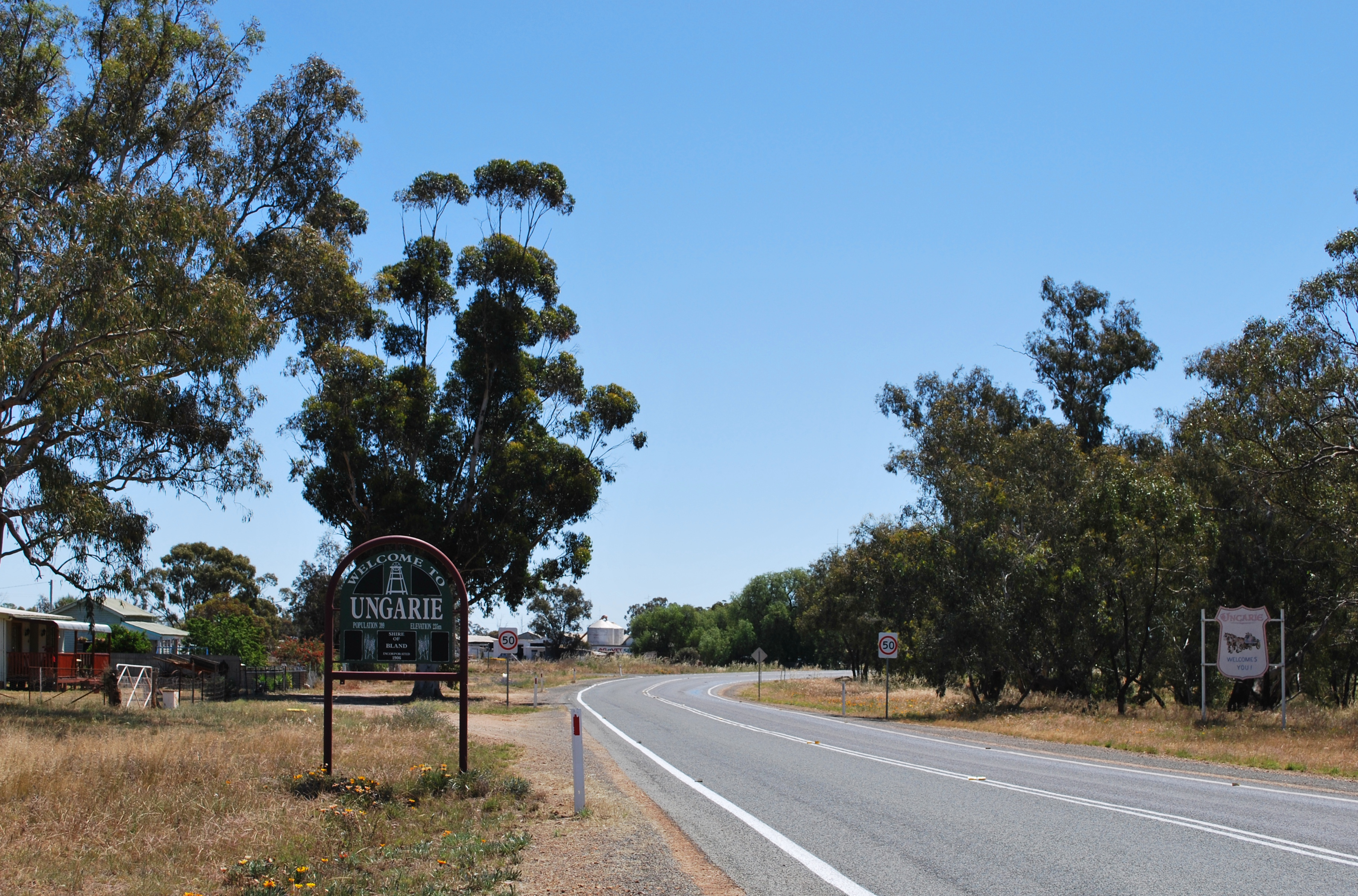
Ungarie Town Entry

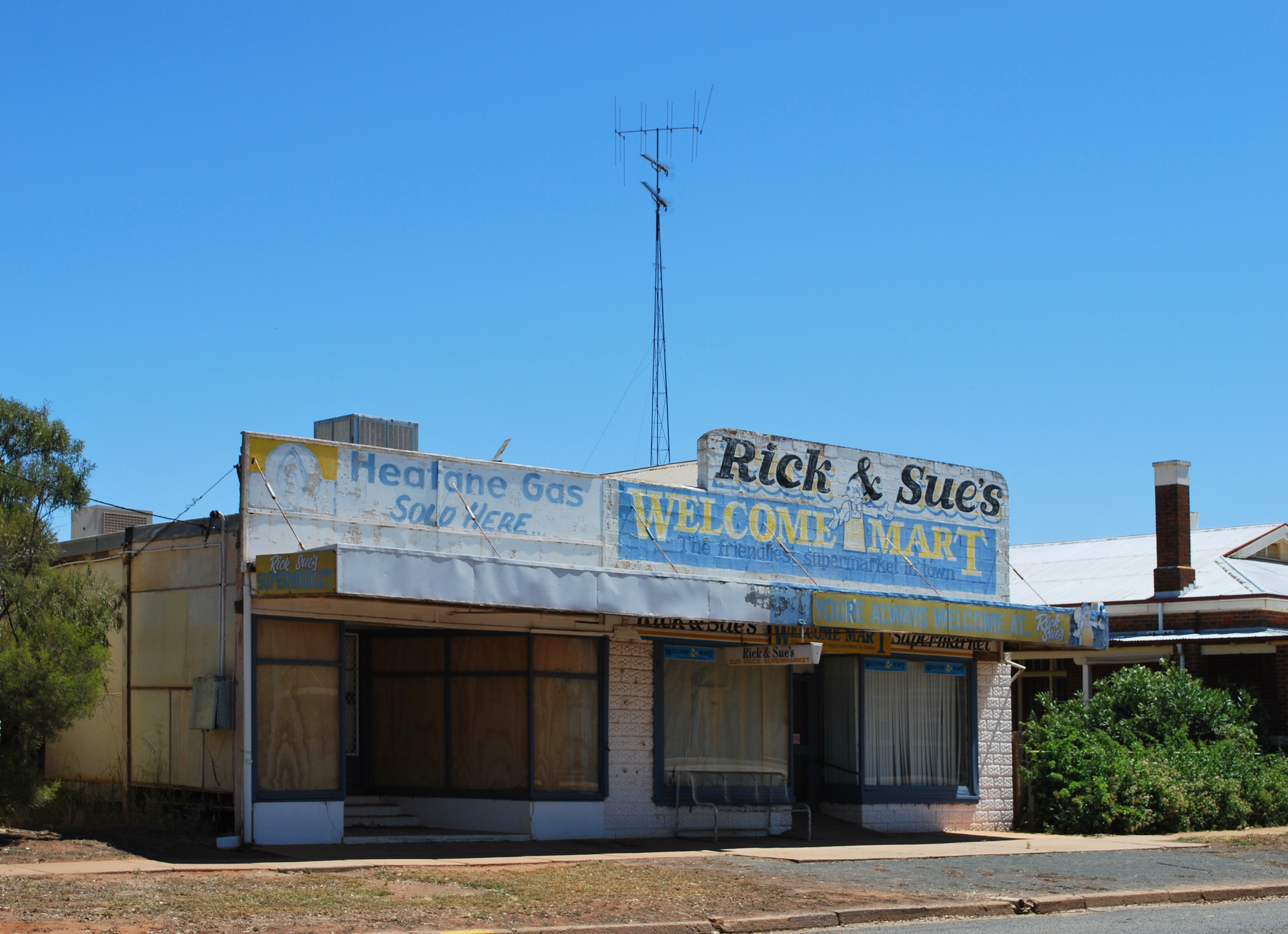
Main Shopping centre

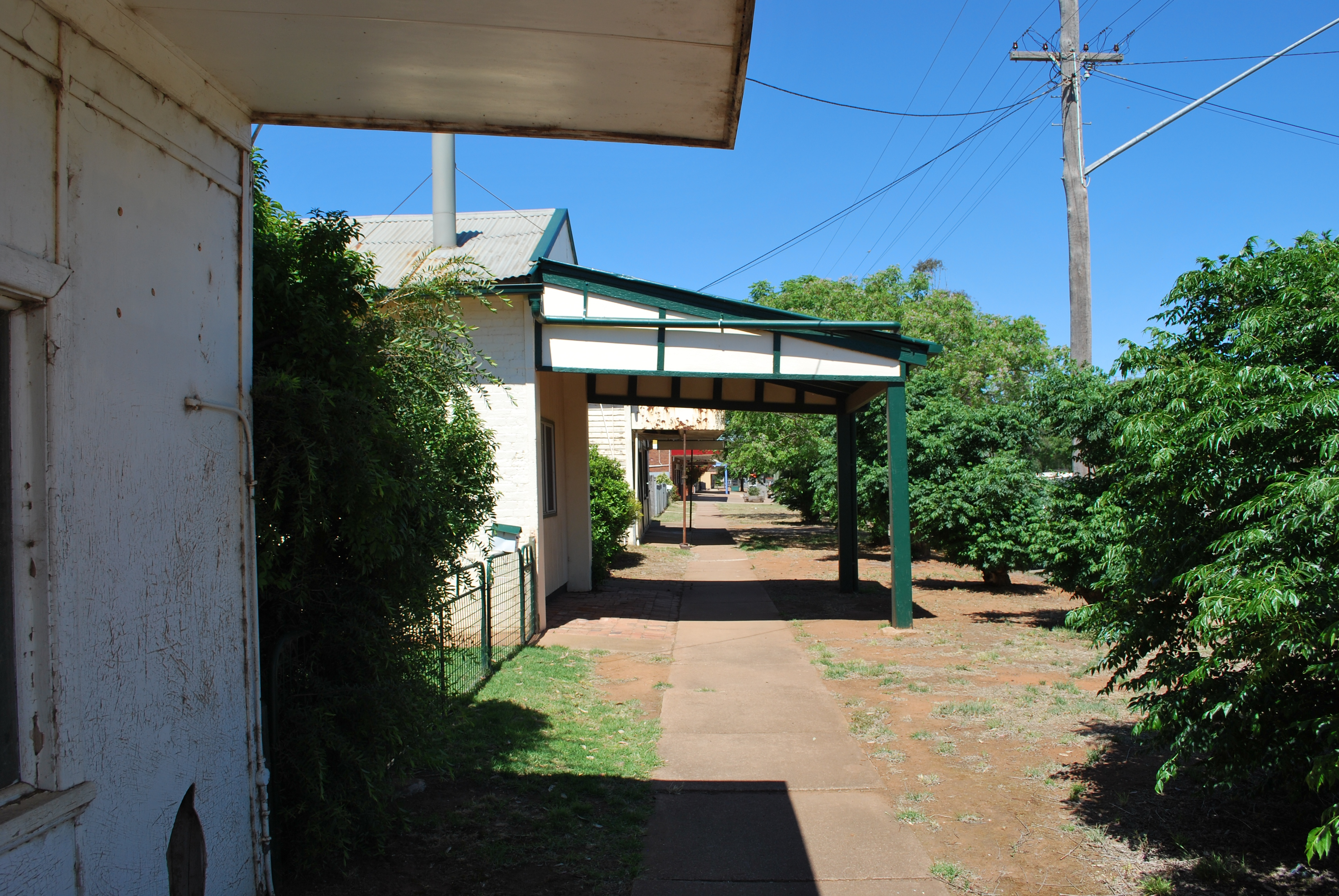
Main Shopping centre

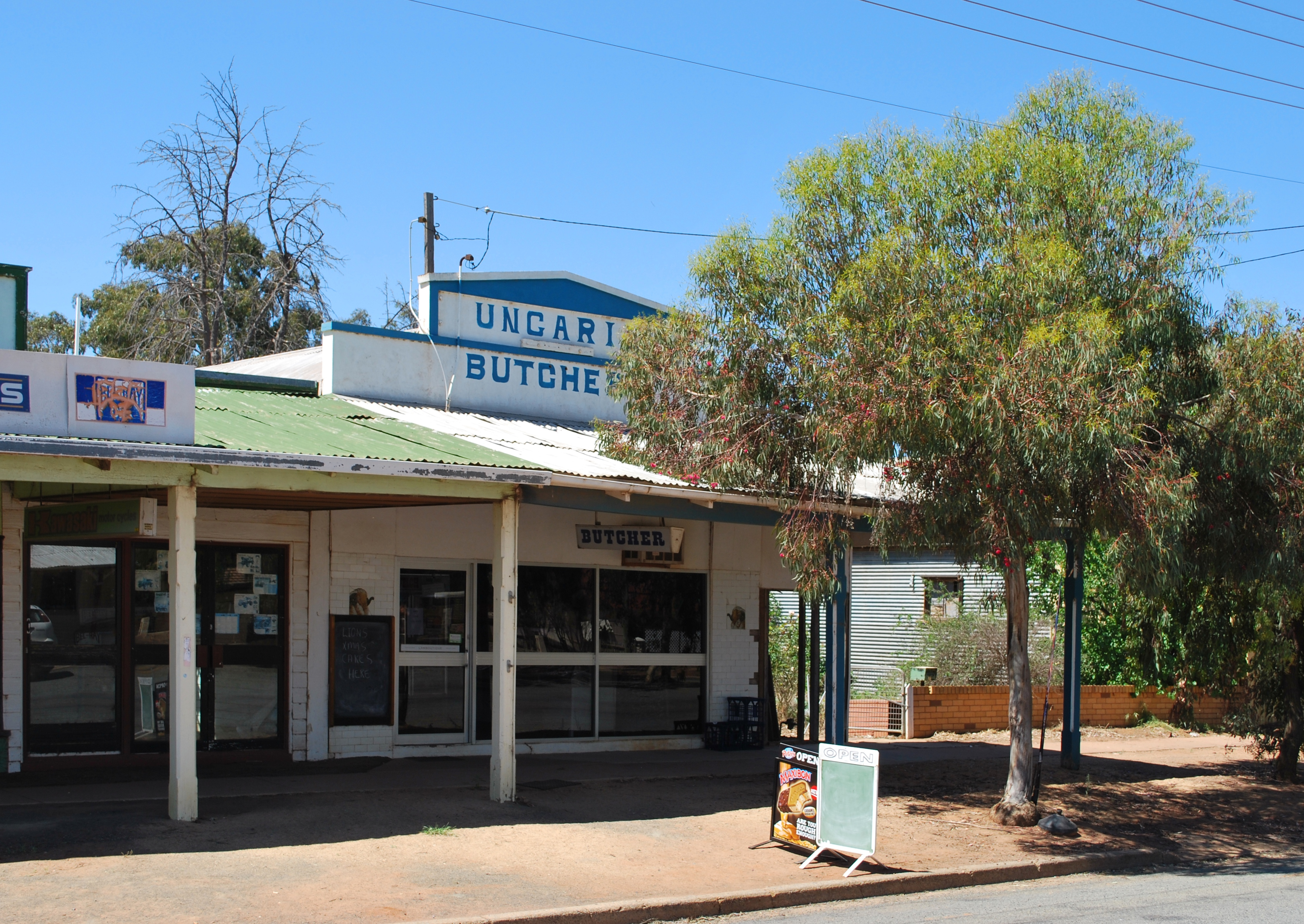
Main Shopping centre

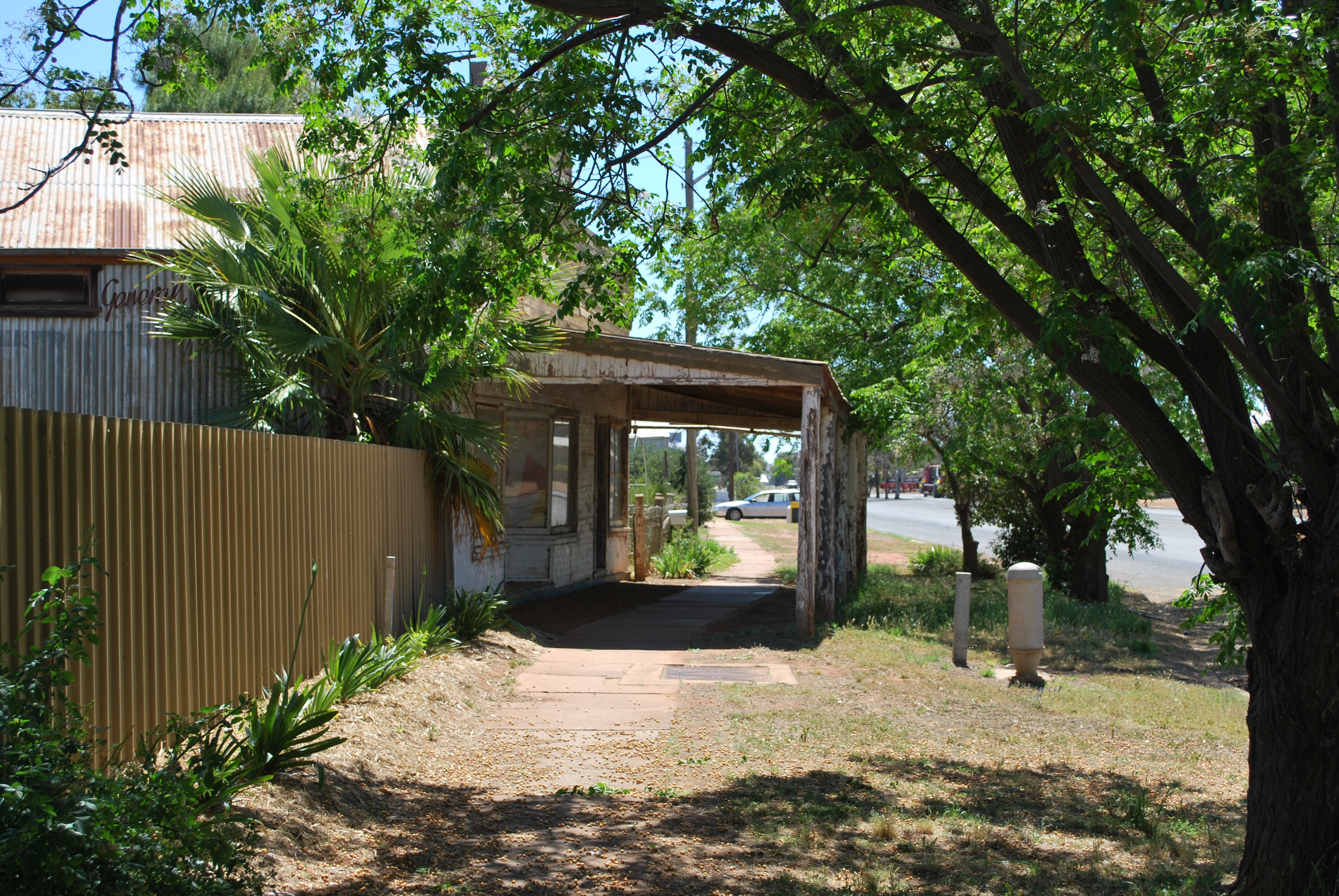
Main Shopping centre

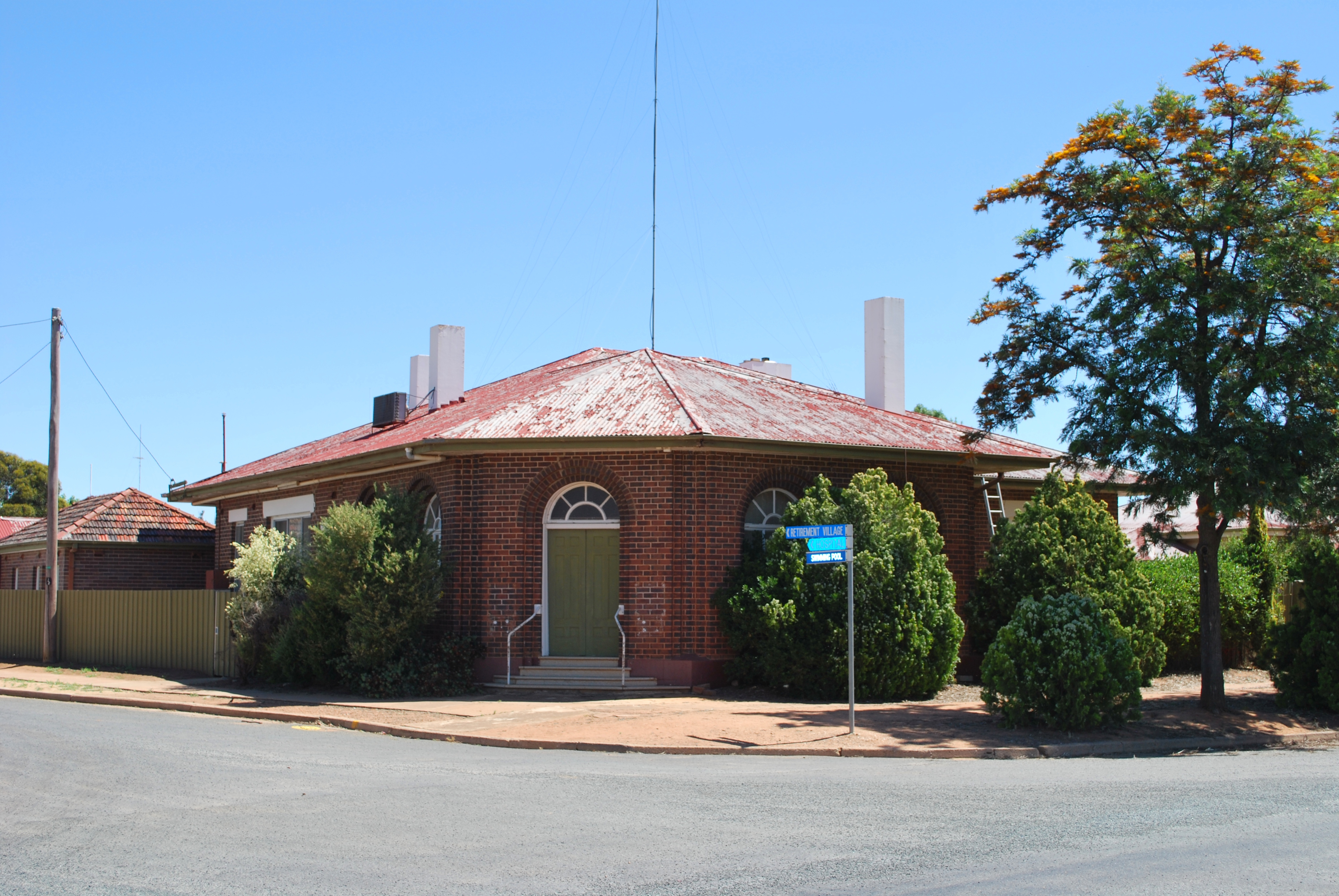
Main Shopping centre

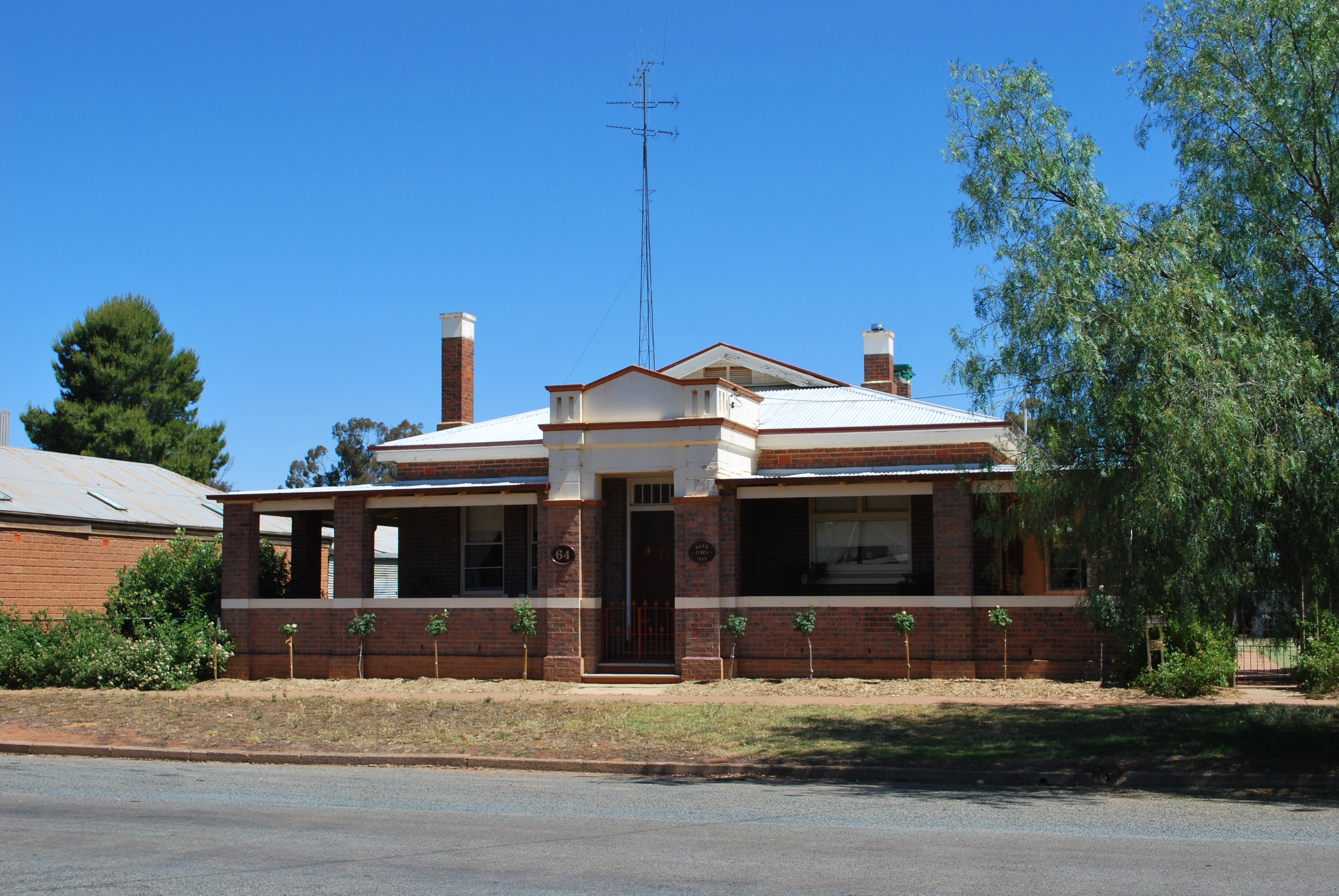
Main Shopping centre

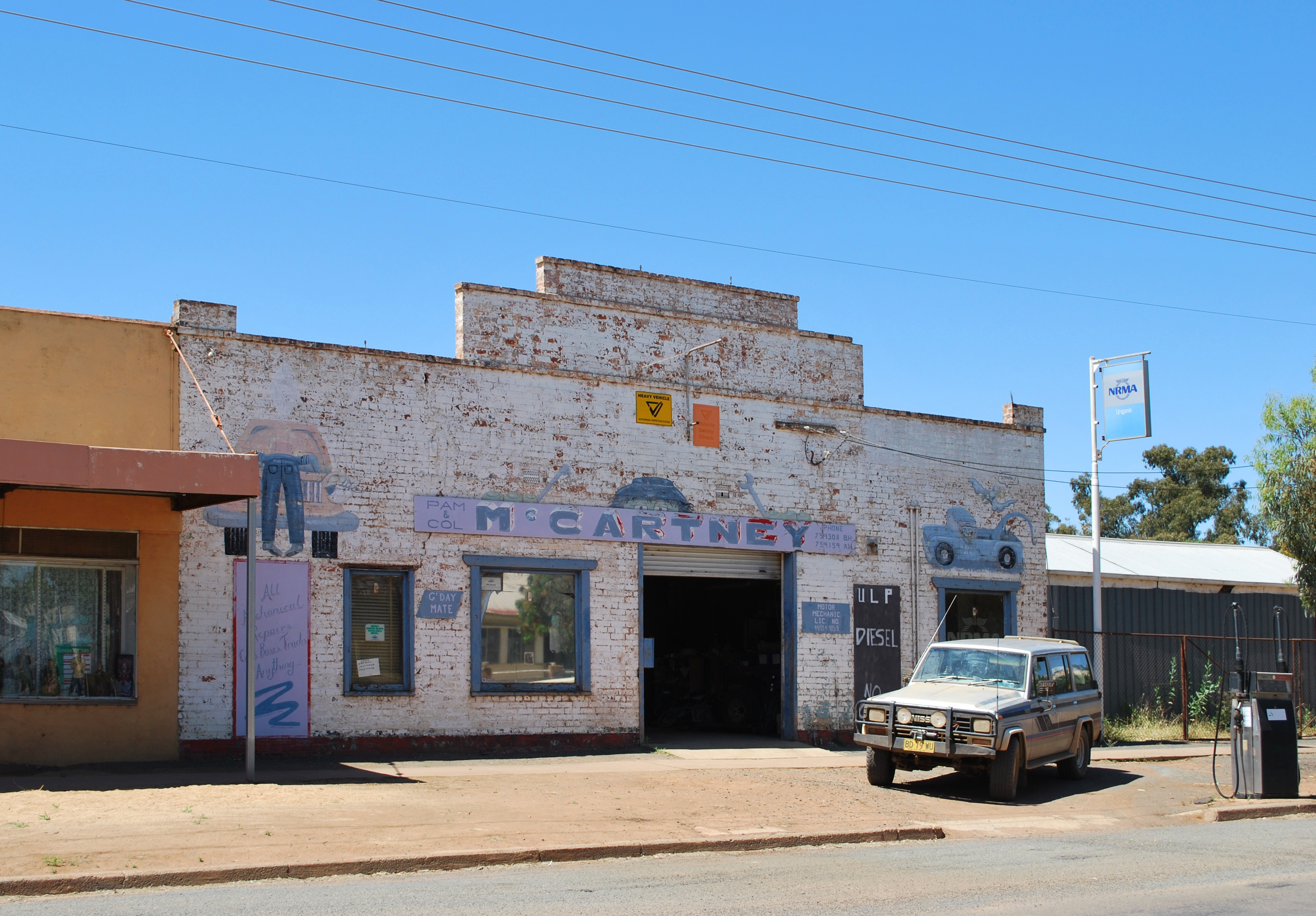
Main Shopping centre

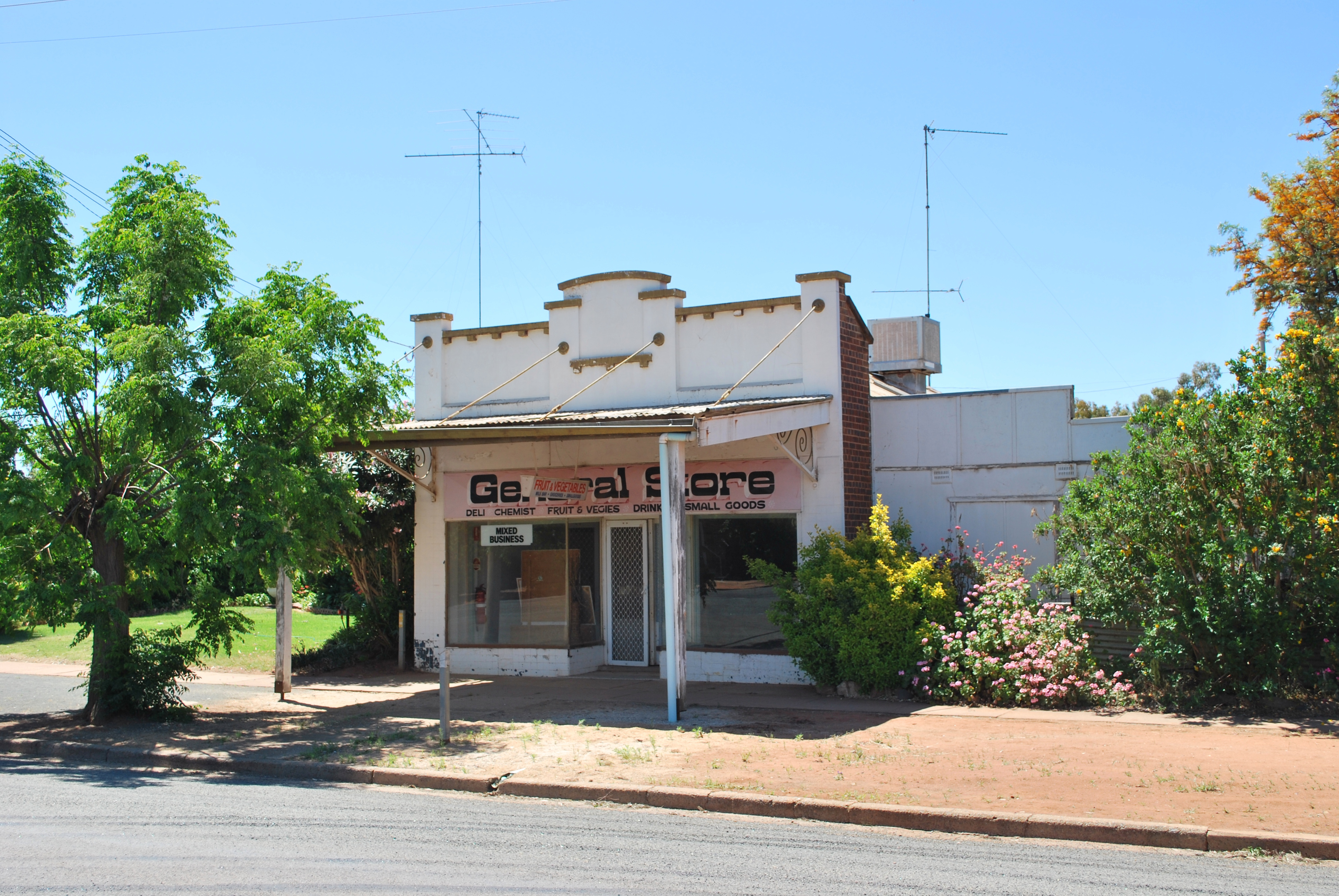
Main Shopping centre

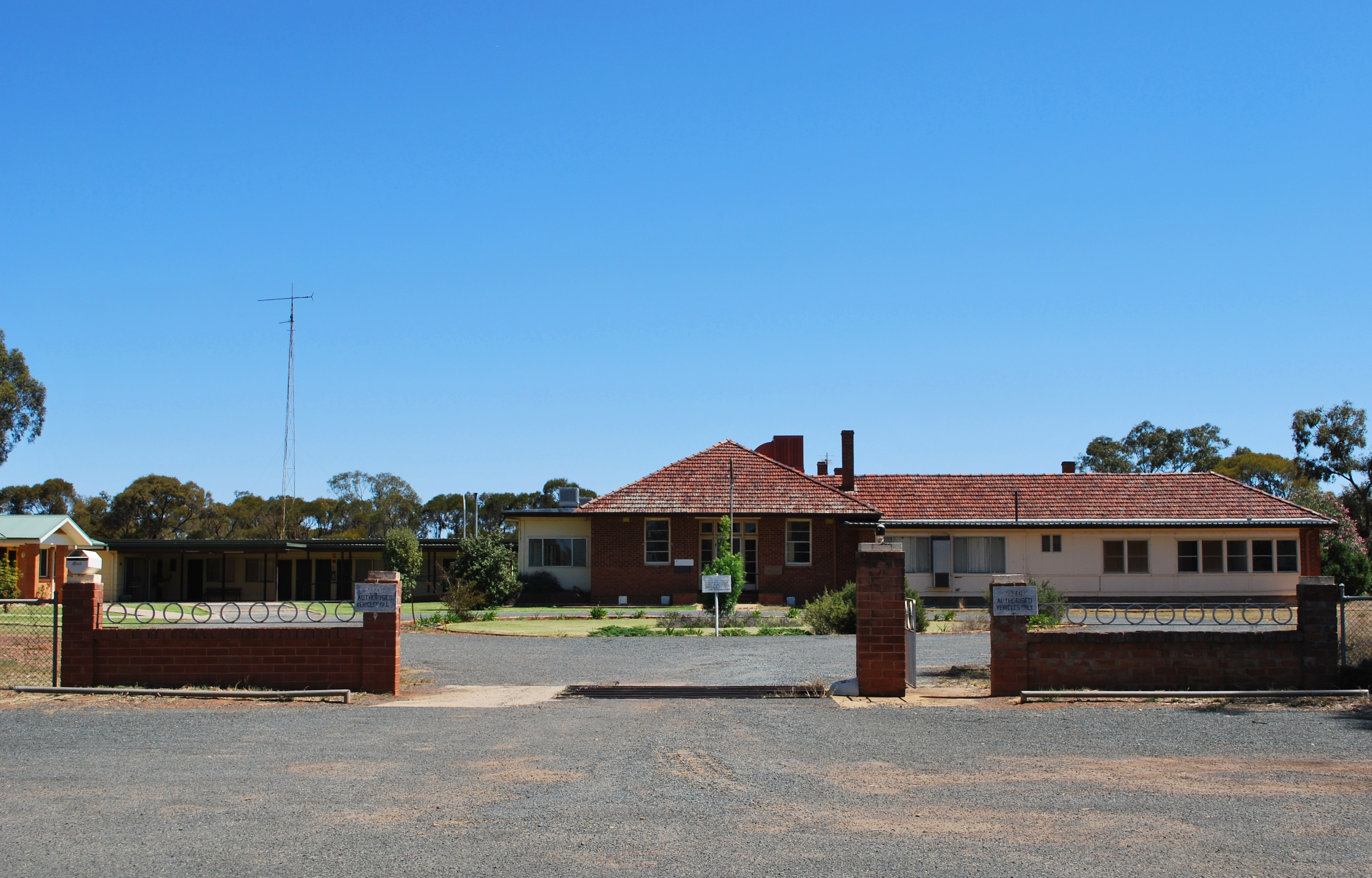
Ungarie Hospital

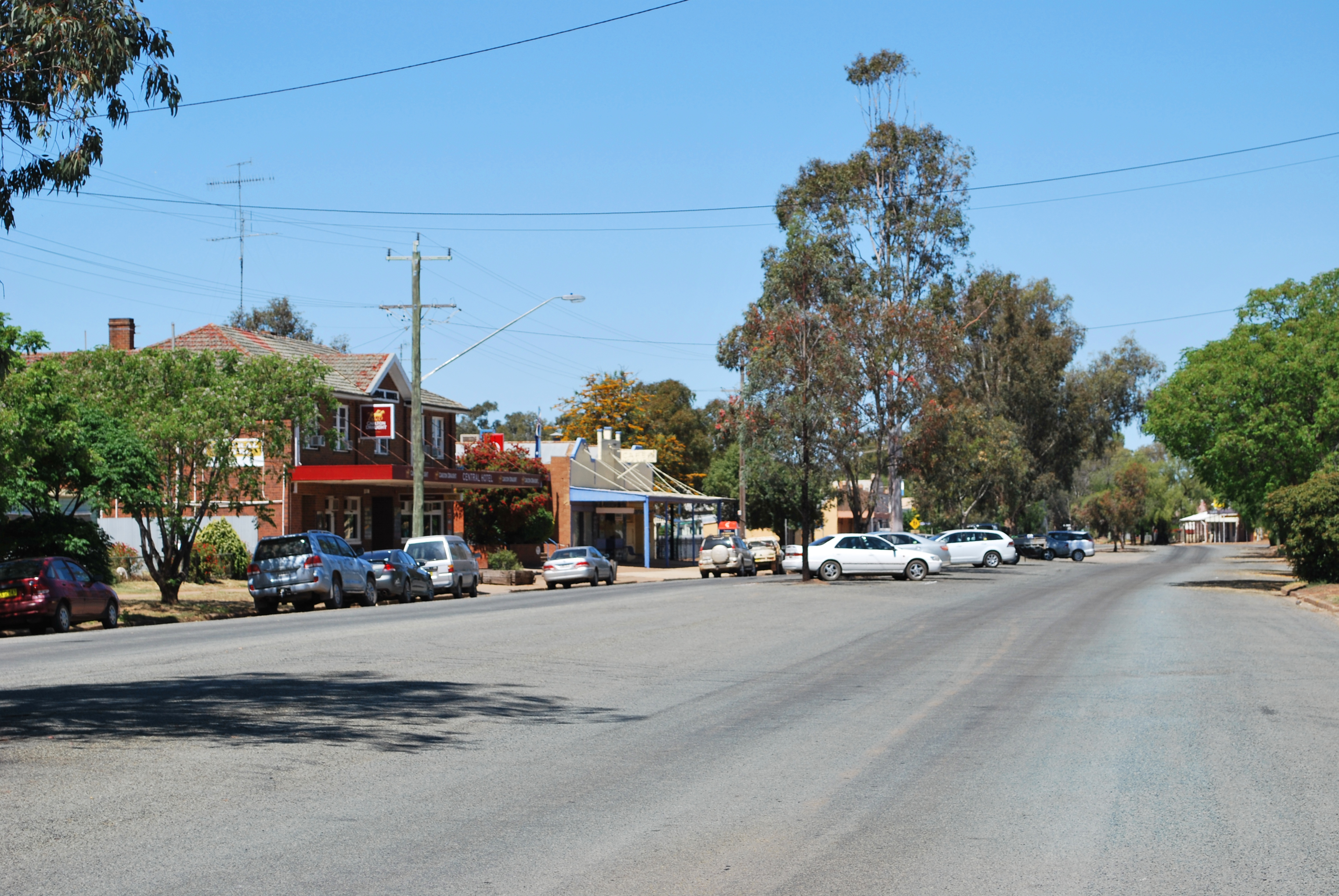
Main Street

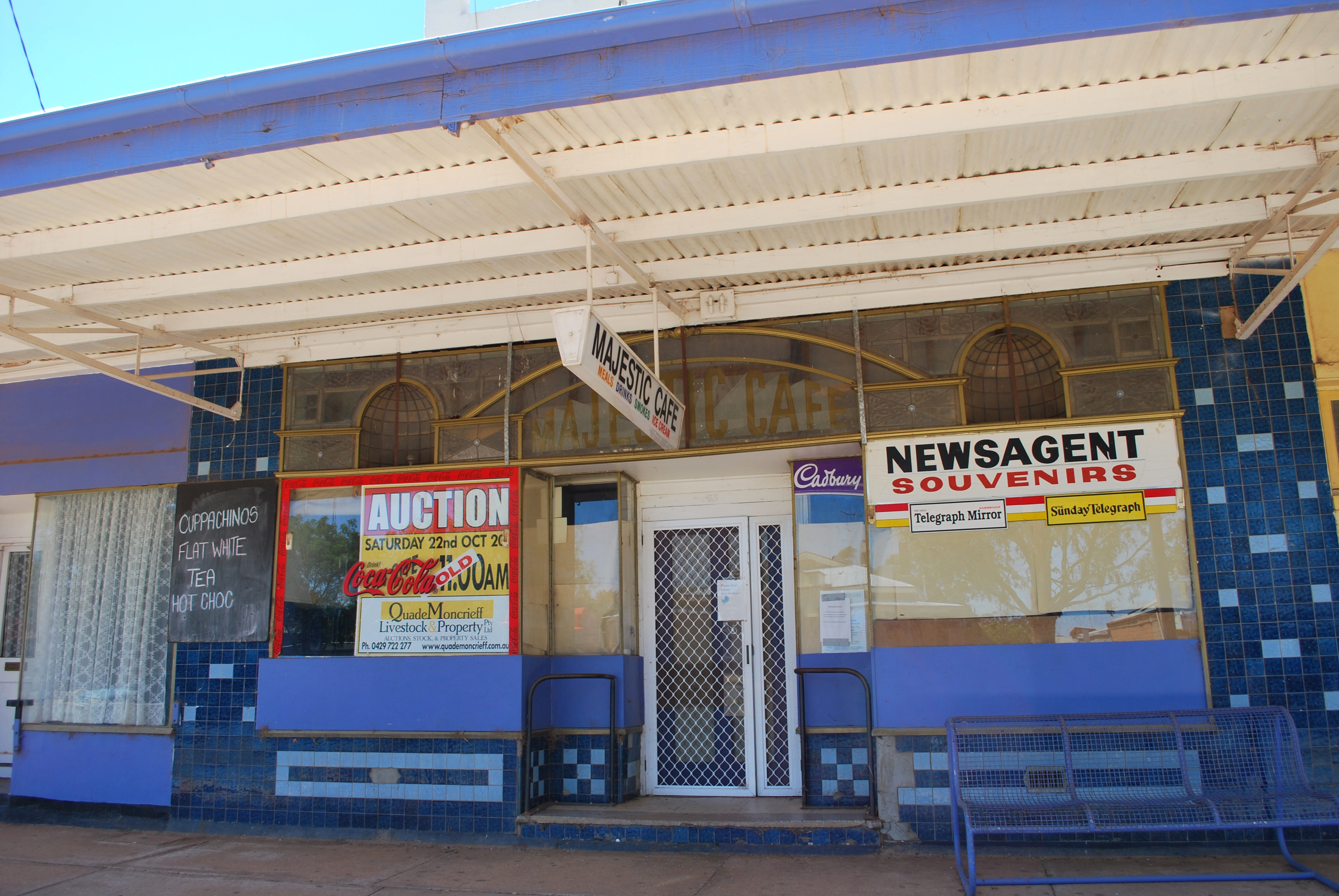
Main Shopping centre

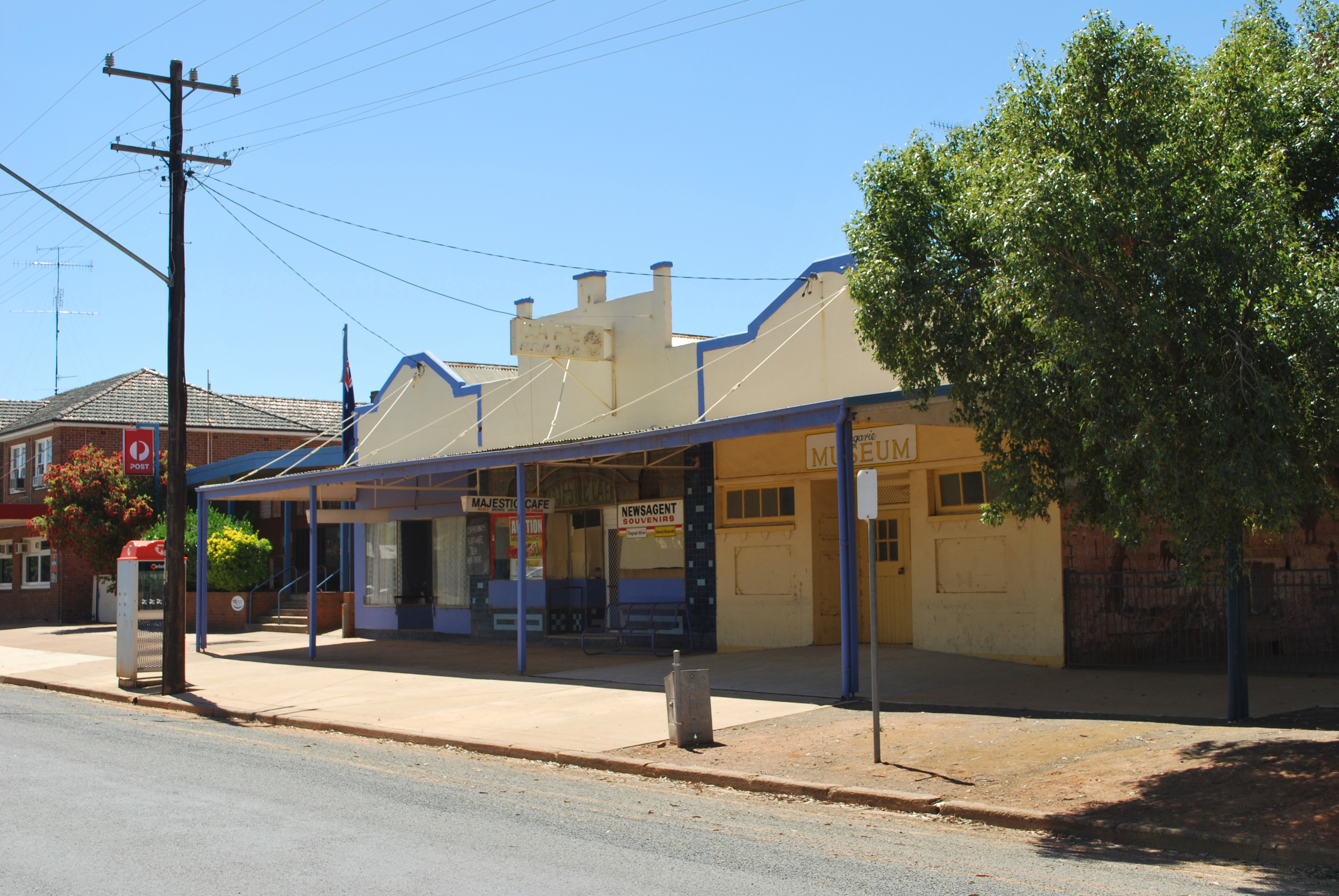
Main Shopping centre and Post Office

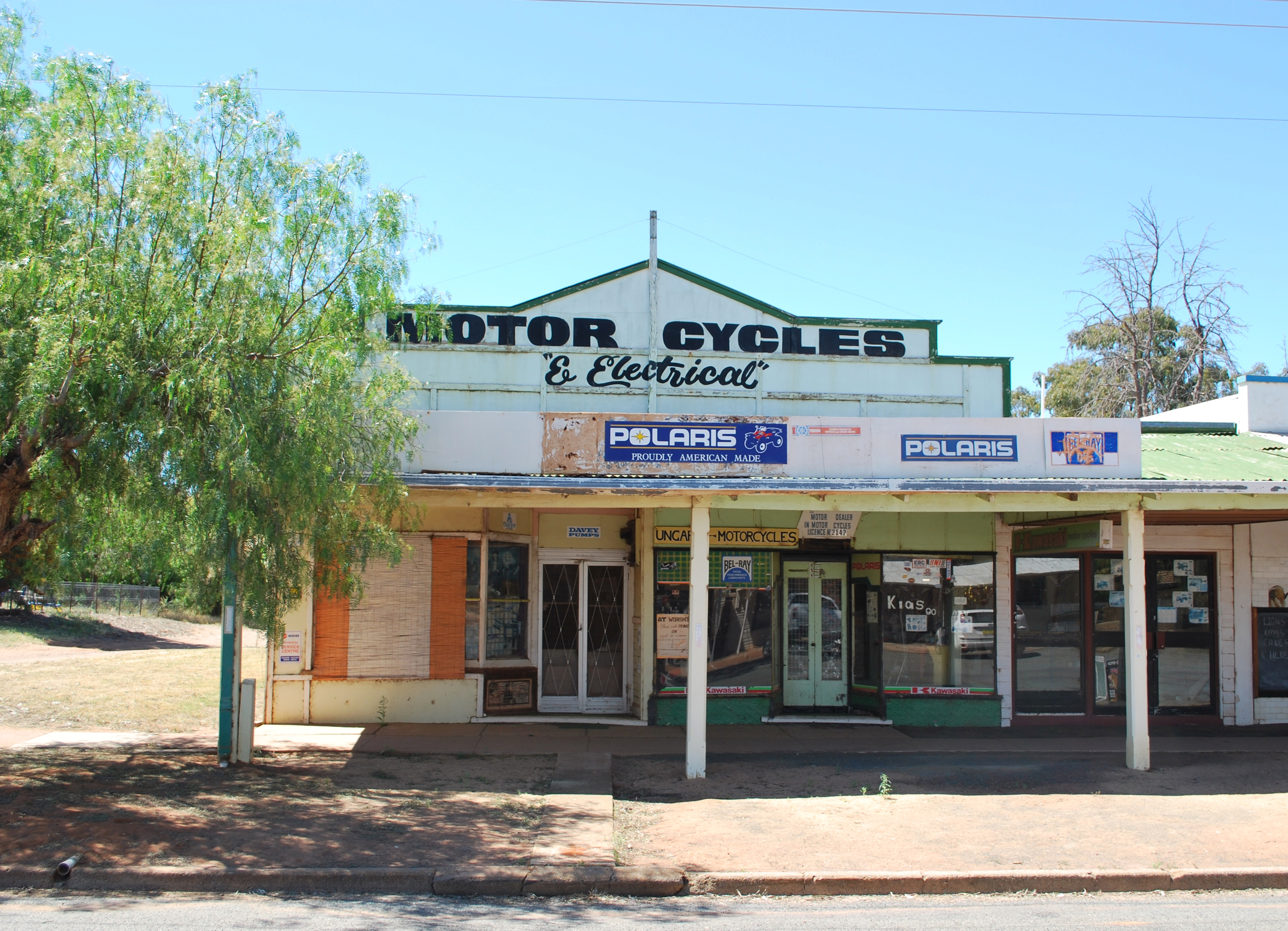
Main Shopping centre

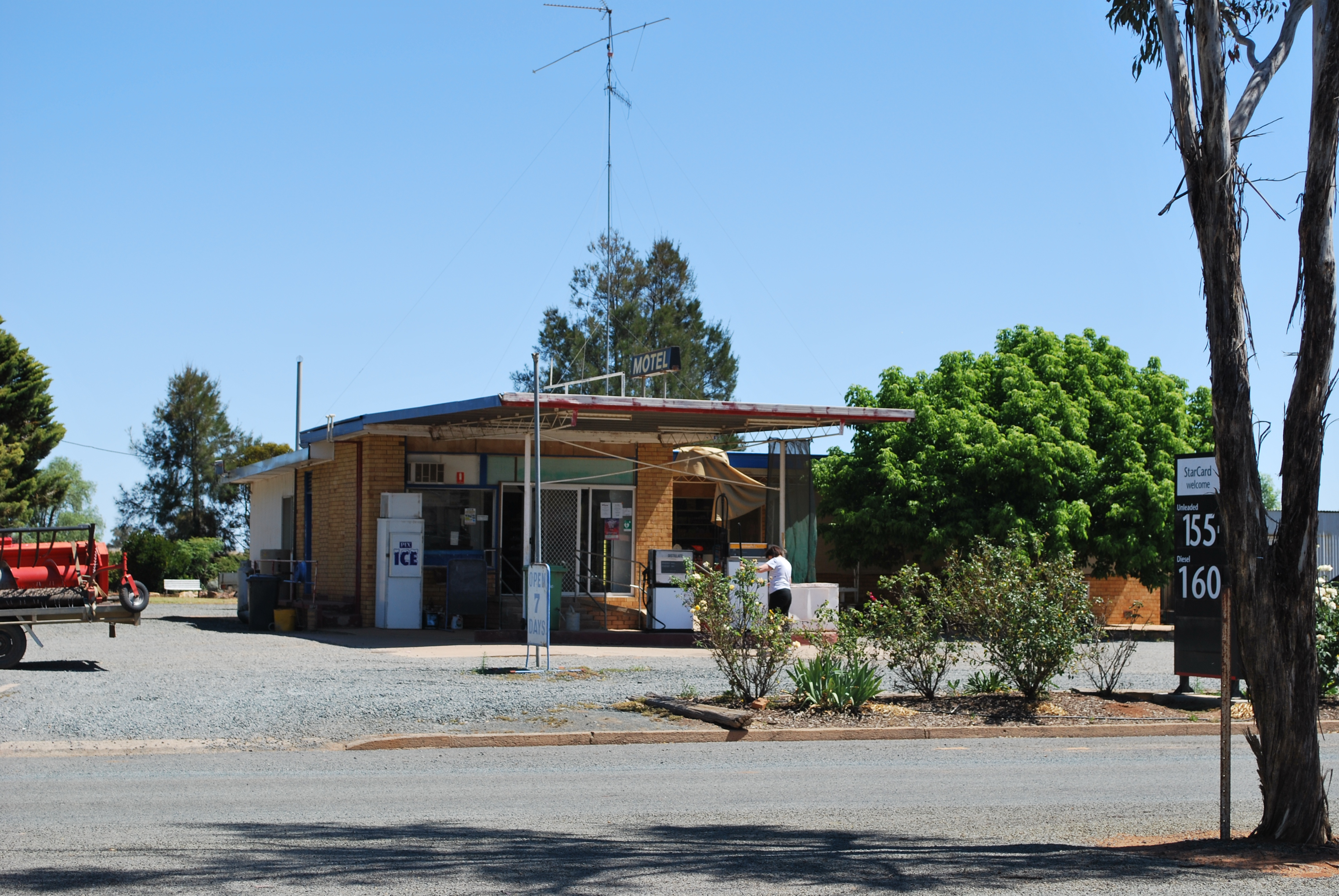
Main Shopping centre

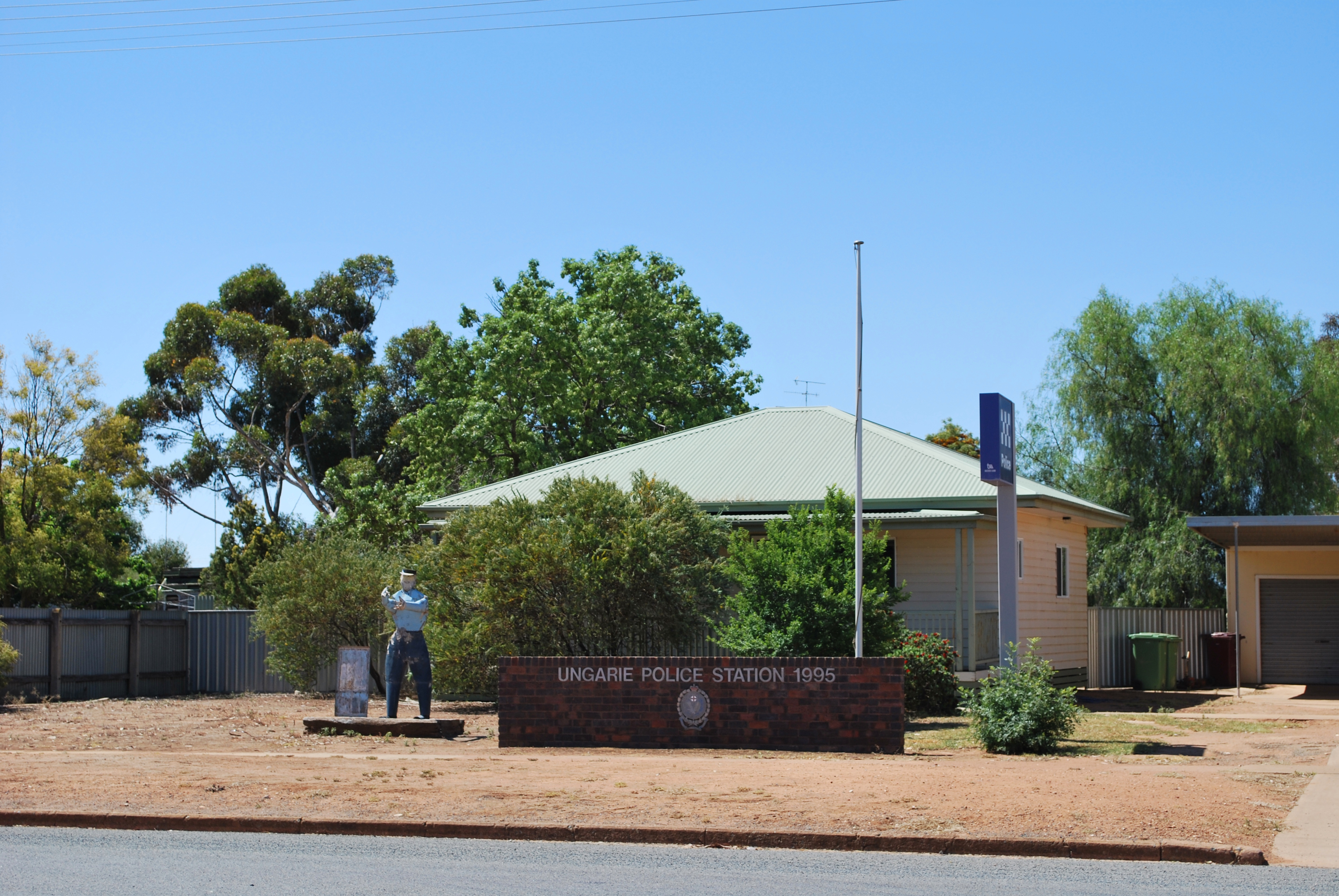
Police Station

== Surrounding towns ==
- Tullibigeal (39 km)
- Burcher (46 km)
- Lake Cargelligo (75 km)
- Weethalle (57 km)
- West Wyalong (44 km)
