= Security Response Section =

The Security Response Section (SRS) is a unit of the South Australia Police, deployed to “at-risk” crowded places such as large protests and AFL games, and to conduct regular patrols of Rundle Mall, the Adelaide Railway Station and the Adelaide Central Market.

The SRS is a second-tier response between general duties and Special Tasks and Rescue (STAR Group). Unlike regular police officers, the unit has enhanced tactical skills and operational equipment including combat helmets, ballistic vests and long-arm weapons such as semi-automatic rifles. The unit is claimed to “significantly bolster public safety”.

== History ==
The unit was first flagged by the Government of South Australia in June 2019 and began operation as of 30 June 2020. On its establishment, there were 48 members of the SRS section. It consists of one inspector, one senior sergeant, six sergeants, six brevet sergeants and 33 constable/senior constables.

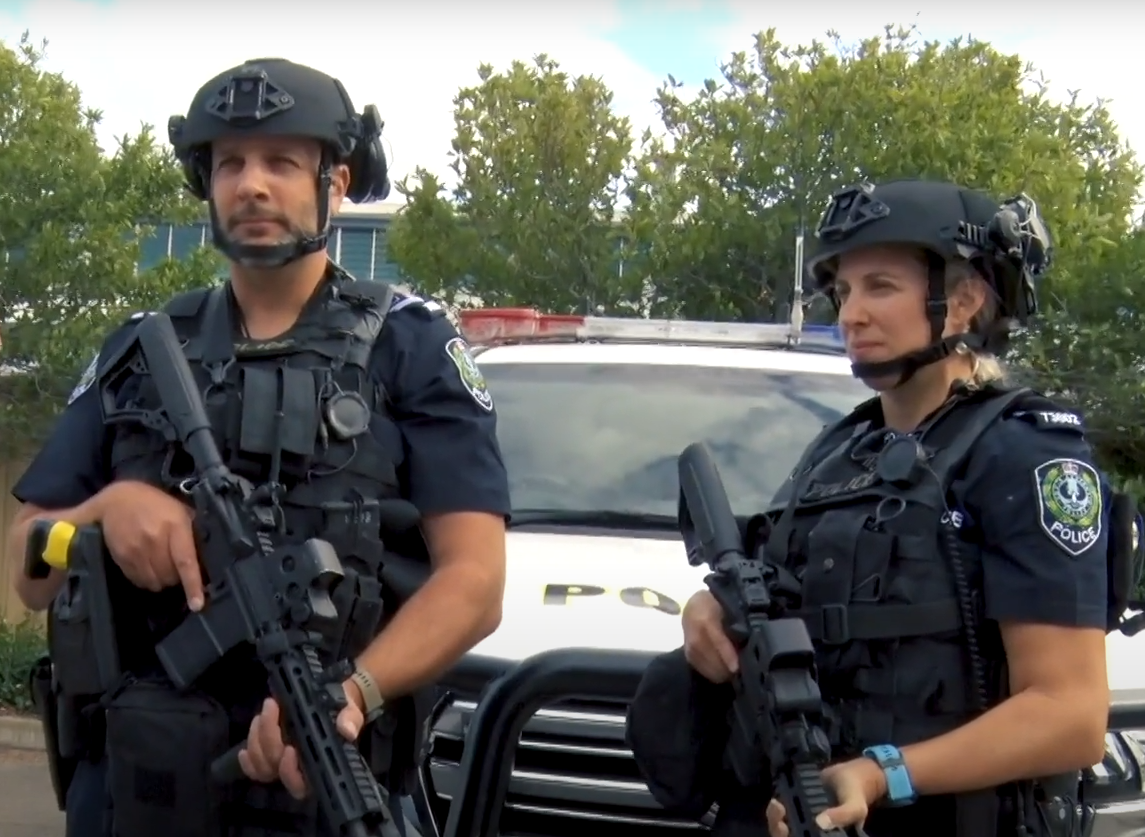
Two SRS officers holding semi automatic weapons

The SRS will cost $9 million, spread between $2.6 million in 2019–20, $2.4 million in 2020–21, and $2.2 million per year from 2021–22.

== Deployment and Purpose ==
Deployment priorities are based around events, intelligence, threat levels and vulnerable locations. The SRS is also intended to prevent and respond to terrorism-related incidents and domestic events of a violent nature. On launching the SRS, Minister for Police Corey Wingard stated:

“Extremists throughout the world are increasingly seeking to inspire like-minded individuals to their repugnant way of thinking and South Australia is not immune to that. There is no place in our State for extreme behaviour and while these officers will be equipped to respond to any threats, their presence at major events will also act as a deterrent to anyone thinking of trying something on.”

The SRS also consists of 'bomb appraisal officers' whose role is to undertake initial assessments of IEDs, and tactical flight officers whose responsibilities include providing situational awareness for responders on the ground.

In March 2024 it was announced that the SRS would be a part of an increased presence in Rundle Mall shopping precinct to deter shoplifters following a series of violent incidents.

== Recruitment and training ==
181 applicants from police serving members were assessed by Aptitude Assessment Centre, and 81 applicants were shortlisted to progress to a basic skills course, which enabled them to apply for a position at the SRC. The duration of the training was two days for aptitude and fitness assessment and six weeks of job-specific training. The unit completed intensive training in tactics traditionally only provided by STAR Group. Training included enhanced first aid training, communication skills, weapon handling, tactical shooting and movement as well as techniques utilised to de-escalate situations. The training is above the level of general duties, but not at the same level as STAR Group Operations.

The police initiated programs to remove bias and barriers for women, and has encouraged women to apply for specialist units. A target was set to engage women at 31% of training participants for the SRS, although the course only attained 20% participation by women.

== Equipment ==
SRS officers carry the following equipment:

- AR-15 style rifle
- Ballistic vest
- Handgun
- Taser
- Pepper spray
- Baton
- Combat helmet
- Radio

SRS officers are also supported in frontline duties by drones.

== Criticisms ==
After announcing the SRS unit, the police received public backlash including an online petition amid fears of an American-style gun culture.

The establishment of unit has been criticised as being "security theatre" and part of a broader militarisation of the police and a "police-industrial complex". The timing of the establishment has also been criticised in relation to the Black Lives Matter movement and the murder of George Floyd just two months prior, drawing concerns about the role of the police and deadly force used against BIPOC communities

Author and critic Ben Brooker has been outspoken about the SRS, stating:

the problem we have now is a sort of a Maslows Hammer problem, the idea that to a man with a hammer everything looks like a nail. So I think now, the fear now, or the danger now is that because we have these incredibly highly armed police responding to situations that are potentially not terrorist situations at all there is this kind of danger of escalations into violence where it need not happen.

Other notable critics include international security analyst David J. Olney, whose criticism primarily focused on the lack of community consultation and appropriate communication strategies prior to the SRS's establishment, as “a real failure of messaging”, and a "total lack of information that we’ve been provided from the people who should have provided it". Gill Hicks, AM MBE FRSA, founder of the London-based not-for-profit M.A.D for Peace reflected on Security Response Section to the Adelaide Podcast with the statement:

I think at a time when people are suffering from the threat of an untreatably deadly virus of great uncertainty in life, work, finances, the last thing the public psyche needs is an added heavy edition. It’s not how we live, especially in Australia, SA.

Within months of its deployment, Brooker in Overland magazine reported that there had been anecdotal reports of SRS officers harassing homeless people, patrolling shopping centres in low-income areas, and hanging around domestic violence shelters.

On 9 September 2020, Greens MLC Tammy Franks moved a motion in the South Australian Parliament "[noting] the significant concerns of many South Australians regarding the arrangements of the new SAPOL Security Response Section (SRS) and [calling] for a public community consultation process on this matter."
