= Jean Eric Gassy =

Australian murderer

- Born: 11 May 1956 (age 70)
- Occupations: Former psychiatrist, security officer
- Conviction: Murder
- Penalty: 30 years non-parole

Jean Eric Gassy is a deregistered medical practitioner who was convicted in October 2004 of the murder on 14 October 2002 of Dr. Margaret Tobin, then the head of government mental health services in South Australia. Dr Tobin was shot four times as she and her colleagues were walking away from the lift that she had taken to the eighth floor of the office in Hindmarsh Square in which she worked. He is now incarcerated in Yatala Prison.

Gassy was struck off in 1997 after being diagnosed with a delusional disorder and refusing to comply with conditions placed on his registration. Gassy's motive was that the person who initiated that deregistration process – by first raising his eligibility to be a psychiatrist or a doctor – was Dr. Tobin, his former boss. Gassy was later found to possess a "hit list" of doctors involved in his deregistration, and an HIV specialist who refused to treat him, after the delusional former doctor became convinced he had contracted the virus.

Gassy was originally sentenced to life imprisonment for the murder. On 14 May 2008 both his conviction and sentence were quashed by the High Court of Australia following an appeal during which Gassy had represented himself. The High Court noted that "the trial judge's directions to a jury deadlocked after a day and a half of deliberations lacked neutrality, causing a substantial miscarriage of justice."

Gassy's retrial on the same charge took place in April 2009 and he was convicted on 6 May 2009.

== Aftermath ==
In 2004, the Margaret Tobin Awards were established to publicly recognise people or organisations that have made an outstanding contribution to mental health in South Australia.

In October 2006, the Margaret Tobin Centre, a 40-bed mental health inpatient centre was constructed on the grounds of the Flinders Medical Centre. Inside Madness, a book by Melissa Sweet, details and summarises the case.
