= Hindmarsh Square =

Square in Adelaide, South Australia

- Mukata
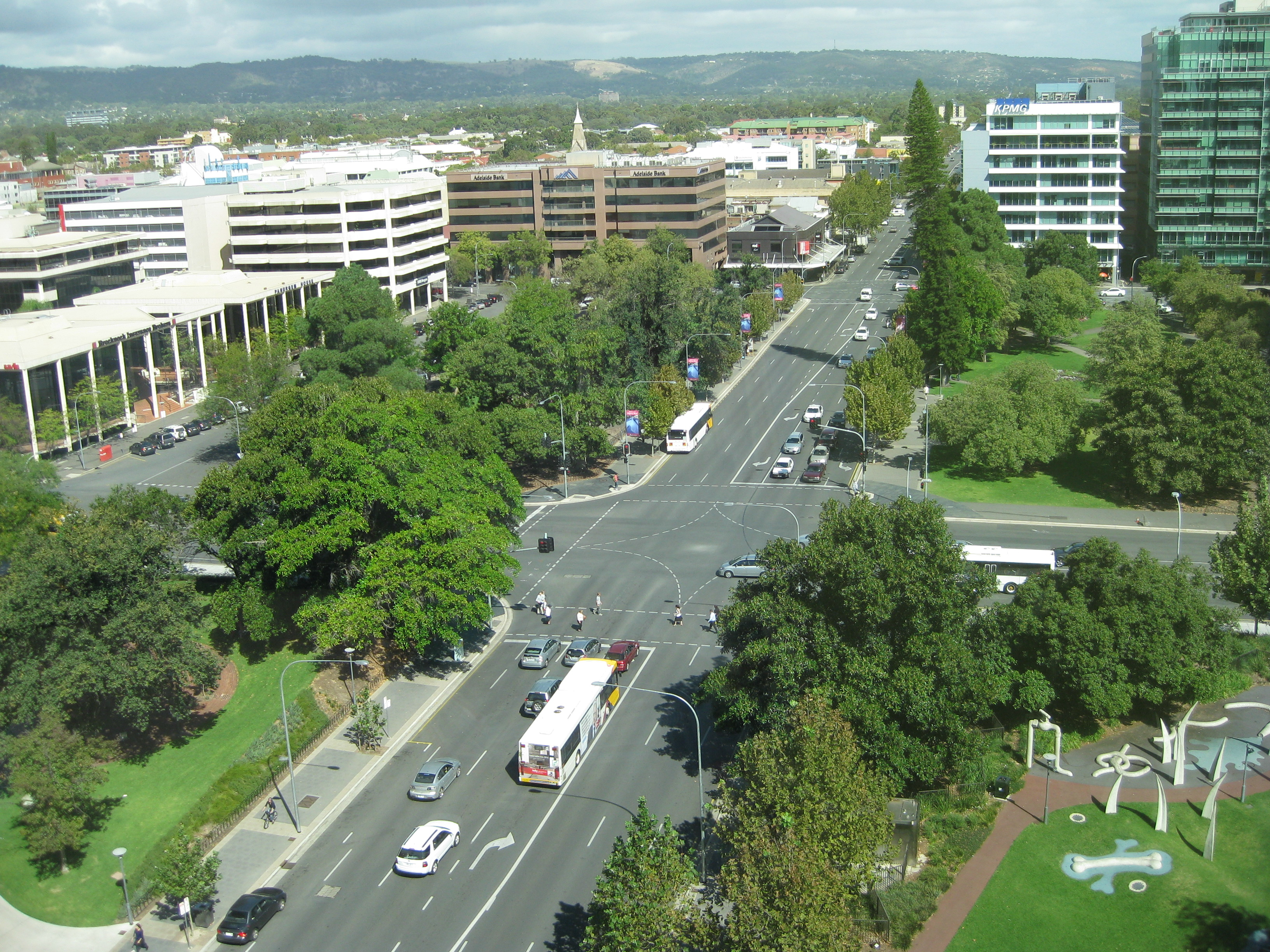
- Hindmarsh Square in 2012

- Location within City of Adelaide
- Namesake: John Hindmarsh
- Maintained by: City of Adelaide
- Location: Adelaide, South Australia, Australia
- Postal code: 5000
- Coordinates: 34.9241°S 138.6057°E
- North: Pulteney Street
- East: Grenfell Street; Pirie Street
- South: Pulteney Street
- West: Grenfell Street; Pirie Street

Construction
- Completed: 1837

Other
- Designer: William Light

Hindmarsh Square, also known by its Kaurna name Mukata, is one of the six public squares in central Adelaide, South Australia. It is located in the north-eastern quarter of the city and is divided into four sections by Grenfell Street and Pulteney Street, with Pirie Street along its southern edge. The square was included in William Light's 1837 city plan. The square was given the name of John Hindmarsh, the first governor of South Australia, on 23 May 1837 through the Street Naming Committee. Later, the Adelaide City Council adopted the dual name Mukata on 27 March 2012 in honour of one of the wives of the Kaurna man Murlawirrapurka.

In 2008, the square is included within the Adelaide Parklands and City Layout, which gained listing on the Australian National Heritage List. Public art that can be found within the square includes Paul Trappe's Untitled pink granite sculpture in 1978, and the Hindmarsh Square Playspace built in 2007, also known as Emo Park. There is also a memorial tree and plaque for Margaret Julia Tobin, the previous director of mental health in South Australia.

== Name ==
The Street Naming Committee decided to name the square after Governor John Hindmarsh on 23 May 1837. In accordance with William Light's Plan of the City of Adelaide, the names given to the squares and streets were gazetted on 3 June.

Following the signing of the Reconciliation Vision Statement in 1997, the City of Adelaide began its Kaurna Naming Project. The project led to a proposal put forward by Rob Amery and Georgina Yambo Williams in 2002, which included naming the square, Mullawirraburka. The namesake is a Kaurna Leader who was also known as Murlawirrapurka or King John. In that same proposal, the name Mogata, the wife of Murlawirrapurka, was given to Rundle Park.

In early 2003, the Kaurna Warra Pintyanthi (KWP) group proposed Mogata as the name for the square to honour Kaurna women in the names of the city's public squares. Despite the council's adoption of the proposal, they asked for alternative ancestral names for a decision regarding the name of the square.

However, in October 2011, KWP confirmed its backing of Mukata. The Kaurna Nation Cultural Heritage Association supported the naming and was willing to assist in creating interpretive signs in February 2012. The council passed the Kaurna name of Mukata on 27 March 2012. The council's 2012–13 annual report confirmed the adoption in February 2013. An alternative spelling Mukarta, meaning "head," was used by the Experience Adelaide official local guide.

Locally, the northern section of the square is known as Emo Park. According to InDaily, young people have met in this park for more than a decade. Additionally, when the youth were interviewed by its Notes on Adelaide podcast, they found that the square gave them a sense of belonging.

== Geography ==
The square is divided into four quadrants and intersected by Pulteney Street and Grenfell Street. In the southern quadrants, there were around 125 car parking spaces. Some of the plants here include the Moreton Bay fig, Captain Cook pine, and Jacaranda, with planting in memory of Margaret Julia Tobin. Additionally, a Bunya Bunya Pine tree was also planted in the square, which later became the tallest in the city centre.

As of 2023, there is a mature Moreton Bay fig in each quadrant. The north-eastern quadrant offered space for rest among shops and a hotel, whereas the north-western quadrant had public statues and shady lawns. The south-eastern quadrant held activities like the Adelaide Fringe arts festival, and the south-western quadrant had tall pine trees with circular flower beds.

Griffins Head Hotel in 2026

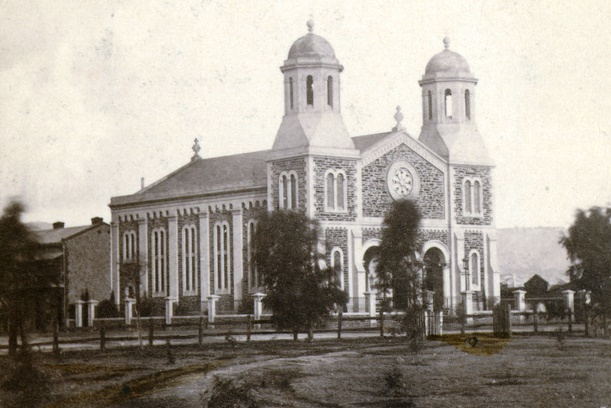
Congregational Church in 1867

Some buildings situated within Hindmarsh Square are Griffins Head Hotel, Hindmarsh Buildings (renamed to AAMI Building), Lady Colton Institute (former YWCA building), former warehouse at 27–29 Hindmarsh Square, and Pullman Adelaide (formerly known as Crowne Plaza Adelaide). On the other hand, former buildings around the square are Congregational Church, Hindmarsh Hotel, Aurora Hotel, Football House, and Academy Cinema City.

== History ==
Before the British colonisation, the area served as a meeting place for Kaurna elders. In 1837, Light selected an area of 6 acres (2.4 ha) for the square. It was one of the six squares planned as part of his city design. His plan consists of a rectangular-shaped area with rounded corners.

George Strickland Kingston's 1842 map shows that Hindmarsh Square has been established. It had initially been surrounded by a wooden fence. In April 1854, the Adelaide Corporation asked for funds to fence and improve the city's gardens. Planting required the planting of 1,500 trees in the square, and George William Francis confirmed the completion of the landscaping and planting contract in September 1855.

When William O'Brien became the city gardener in 1861, he suggested planting a sweet briar hedge and more than 750 trees and shrubs in the square. Under his management, ornamental trees were planted, and the paths were gravelled. The trees that were planted in the square included Moreton Bay figs, small-leaved figs and Norfolk Island pines. Plans from 1865 and 1871 show the rows of trees and winding paths in the square respectively. Ornamental cast-iron fencing was erected by early 1881, and by 1886 the plans showed a Union Jack layout of the square's paths.

In 1899, City Gardener Pelzer made changes to the lawn and trees and planted flowers in the square. By 1901, wires had been set up as a fence to prevent the entry of dogs into the gardens. In 1909, the Municipal Tramways Trust created electric tram lines on the paths of Pulteney and Grenfell streets, which led to the square splitting into four quadrants. Following the completion of Pelzer's landscaping in 1910, a tramway signal house was erected in the northern quadrant in 1912. By 1914, the roads through the square had been established. The widening of Pirie Street in 1926 led to the decrease in the area of the southern quadrant, resulting in the cutting of eight trees.

Service station on the eastern side of Hindmarsh Square, 23 March 1937

Pelzer made another revision of the square's layout in the 1930s. From 1935 to 1936, a design by Stanley Orchard featuring diagonal walkways and 39 golden ash trees was accepted by the council. In 1953, lawn planting took place, and six trees were removed. In 1977, a plan restricted vehicular access from Pulteney Street to the quadrants and the landscaping design for the northern quadrants was completed.

By 1982, the council owned all structures within the square except for the Aurora Hotel. The council intended to redevelop the site for offices and an underground CitiCom car park. The council had classified the hotel as a possible heritage listing through its 1982 heritage assessment. However, the Lord Mayor's Heritage Advisory Committee had twice rejected these recommendations. On 27 June 1983, the council approved the application by Vensa Pty Ltd for the demolition of the hotel and construction of an office building.

Andrew Cawthorne and the Adelaide Residents' Society organised a demonstration in October 1983 that turned into a campaign. In four days, a petition managed to garner 1,049 signatures, and the Building Construction Workers Federation initiated a green ban. On 29 November, the Supreme Court handed out injunctions against both protesters and union officials. The demolition began on 1 December 1983, and the NatWest Building was erected at the same place. As a result, the Aurora Heritage Action was formed as a heritage preservation advocate in Adelaide.

The Adelaide Park Lands and City Layout were listed on the National Heritage List on 7 November 2008. Hindmarsh Square was among the six squares specifically mentioned in the listed place.

== Monuments and public art ==
As early as January 1867, a drinking fountain was built at the northern end of Hindmarsh Square. Councillor Adolph Bartels had proposed that it should be moved to the square's centre because the water could be used to promote tree growth. That same year, Bartels presented an ornamental fountain containing a boy statue with a basin held up high above his head. The Bartels Fountain began operating on 13 June 1868. However, in February 1895, the council decided to convert the unused ornamental fountain into a drinking fountain. After several children had fallen in, the water in the basin was reduced to just 6 inches (15 cm) of depth. This was also due to the raising of the surrounding footpaths, which led to the stone rim becoming too dangerous.

Untitled in 2026

The Untitled sculpture by Paul Trappe was commissioned by the council in 1978, in the north-eastern quadrant. Trappe carved it out of pink granite extracted from Murray Bridge, the sculpture was officially unveiled in 1977 by the Arts Minister Murray Hill. The round opening in the sculpture is similar to the dome in the fountain nearby.

In memory of Margaret Julia Tobin, the director of the state's mental health, a memorial tree and plaque were erected. Tobin was murdered at the CitiCentre building on 14 October 2002. Her husband, Don Scott, planted the tree in the square on 14 October 2003, one year after her death. Over a hundred people have turned up for the ceremony, where Premier Mike Rann has awarded prizes for excellence in mental health.

In 2007, the Hindmarsh Square Playspace was designed by Ryan Sims, Andrew Stock, and Gerry Wedd with the help of landscape architectural firm Taylor Cullity Lethlean. The playspace is also referred to as Emo Park and has giant figures of tap, hose, thong, and fish bones that have been made using fibreglass and reinforced concrete.

On 28 April 2025, the South Australia Police along with the South Australia Police Historical Society celebrated Police Foundation Day by unveiling a plaque in memory of Foot Constable John McLennan Holman at the square. Holman died in police duty after being shot dead in 1929 at that same location.

== Events ==
The square was the camping grounds for the Occupy Adelaide protesters in November 2011. However, they were ordered to leave the area on account of a council by-law which prohibited camping in public parks and squares within the city limits. Although the leaving notice, the time limit was subsequently extended.

In October 2015, the square hosted the Adelaide Fashion Festival runway event. This was followed by the 2021 Adelaide Fringe, where Wonderland Spiegeltent Festival Hub occupied the south-eastern quadrant. In July 2024, the council sanctioned the use of the same part of the square for the City to Bay Fun Run Expo events from 2024 to 2028. This square was also the site of the Jazz in the Square on 2 May 2025, as part of the Adelaide Jazz Festival, and the 10th anniversary Music in the Square concert on 13 February 2026.

== Gallery ==
Footpath on the North-eastern quadrant

Person walking in the South-eastern quadrant

Footpath on the South-western quadrant

Hindmarsh Square Playspace on the north-western quadrant

A fountain in the north-western quadrant, 2026

AAMI Building at 49 Hindmarsh Square in 2026
