= SA Police =

SA Police may refer to:

- South African Police, former police force in South Africa from the early 20th century until the end of Apartheid.
- South African Police Service, the current national police force of South Africa.
- South Australia Police, the police force of the state of South Australia.
