= Ivor Bren Green =

Australian civil servant and police commissioner

- Born: 14 October 1897; Port Pirie, South Australia
- Died: 10 April 1957 (aged 59) Adelaide, South Australia
- Buried: North Road Cemetery
- Allegiance: Australia
- Branch: Royal Australian Air Force
- Service years: 1941–1946
- Rank: Squadron leader
- Commands: Administrative and Special Duties Branch (A & S D Branch), HQ Allied Air Forces, Brisbane (1944-45).
- Conflicts: Second World War
- Awards: Lieutenant of the Royal Victorian Order
- Other work: Commissioner of the South Australia Police (1950–57)

Ivor Bren Green LVO (1897 – 1957), civil servant, was a senior clerk of courts in South Australia, a RAAF squadron leader in World War II and the 14th Police Commissioner of South Australia 1950-57.

== Port Pirie origins ==
Ivor Bren Green was born 14 October 1897 at Port Pirie, South Australia, the second son of Arthur Amos Green and Evelyn Edith Green ("nee" Brown). Despite popular assumptions, his middle name is not associated with the Bren light machine gun, which was not designed until 1935. In reality, Ivor's parents had a first child, John, and then a daughter whom they named Brenda, but she died as an infant. When Ivor was born they gave him the second name of Bren in memory of Brenda.

Ivor was only eight months old when his father, an ex-captain of The Salvation Army, died of typhoid, aged just 37 years. Raised by his mother, who was to live until 1955, the ambitious youth graduated from Port Pirie High School in 1910 having passed six subjects, two more than the minimum four subjects in the Adelaide University Primary Examination.

Upon leaving High School, despite a hunger for higher education, he was obliged by limited family finances to promptly seek employment. For several years he was taken onto the costing staff of the local lead smelters, now owned by Nyrstar, while joining the Port Pirie Local Court in 1913 as a junior clerk. His community service in Port Pirie included being appointed in 1922 secretary to the local hospital, and in 1925 he was appointed a Justice of the peace. It was not until 1929, as an adult student, that he obtained his Leaving Certificate with passes in English Literature and Economics.

== Army Reserve Service in WWI ==
In the meantime, he served in the part-time Citizen Forces for four years in senior cadets, three of which were with rank of second lieutenant, followed from November 1915 by five years with the rank of lieutenant. For a portion of the latter period he was a company commander, and for another period adjutant of a battalion.

In 1917 Green joined the Australian Commonwealth Forces as a member of the 81st (Wakefield) Infantry Brigade, with headquarters at Port Pirie and companies throughout the Mid North Region. As one of the company lieutenants, Green was one of the two quartermaster lieutenants. He was not posted to overseas service during World War I.

== Clerk of Courts in Adelaide ==
Green transferred to the Adelaide Police Court as a clerk in 1917. He married Olive Millicent Fisk (1890-1982) on 23 December 1919 in All Soul's Church, St Peters. They settled in suburban Broadview and later had two daughters: Evelyn Patricia Green and Brenda Thurlow Green.

In 1922 he was a relieving Clerk of Courts at Port Adelaide, where he inaugurated the practice of taking down evidence on a noiseless typewriter. In 1925 he was transferred to Adelaide Local Court as the first clerk to be appointed an associate to a judge, namely Judge Samuel James Mitchell. In October 1925 he became Deputy Clerk of the Adelaide Police Court. His favourite recreation in these years was tennis.

== RAAF Service in WWII ==
Having gained particular experience in law (civil and commercial), accountancy, and clerical administration, upon the outbreak of WWII he was called up to join the Administrative and Special Duties Branch (A & S D Branch) of the Citizen Air Force. Posted to the School of Administration in Melbourne on 10 March 1941 he was granted a commission as a flying officer. One month later he was posted to 22 Squadron, Richmond, and nine months later to RAAF Base Wagga, and then to Cootamundra, where he was promoted to Temporary Flight Lieutenant.

He then served eighteen months at Allied Air Forces Headquarters, Brisbane, where he was camp commandant, being promoted to Acting Squadron Leader. In this role he was responsible for managing administrative duties, intelligence duties, marine craft duties, physical training duties, operations room, defence, catering, and mechanical transport within the Command.

His final postings were to Macrossan and Bowen in the tropics, before being demobilised at Adelaide on 4 July 1946. He did not serve outside Australia and was assessed by his commanding officer in December 1944 as "an average junior A & S D officer".

== Police Commissioner ==
Following his military service, Green resumed work in his former position as Deputy Clerk in the Adelaide Police Court. In May 1948, despite having no police experience, he was appointed as Secretary to William Francis Johns (1885-1972), Commissioner of Police. Unlike his understudy, Commissioner Johns had a long and colourful police career, but his service was limited by the Police Act, which stipulated that he must retire on 30 June after reaching 65 years of age.

In May 1950 Ivor Green was appointed by the Executive Council to be Acting Police Commissioner during the absence of Commissioner Johns overseas, touring Britain and the Continent. Johns officially retired on 30 June 1950, although until his long service leave expired an appointment was not necessary. He did not return from overseas until September 1950, upon which, on 28 September 1950, at age 52, Ivor Green was appointed by the Executive Council to succeed Commissioner Johns. It was the first time that a member of the administrative staff of the Police Department had received such an appointment.

One of the early innovations made by Green was the selling off of the last camels owned by the police. He reported to the Government in 1951 that these animals were now redundant for police service and had been replaced by Land Rover vehicles in the outback. He became aware that a huge volume of redundant equipment, much dating back to the Victorian era, including horse-drawn vehicles, was stored at Thebarton Police Barracks. In June 1951 Green ordered a stocktake which in February 1953 resulted in a vast array of equipment being either destroyed or sold in a public auction lasting over several days.

In January 1951 Green had the sad duty of presiding at three police funerals on the very same day. The three police officers had tragically lost their lives fighting a bushfire at Upper Sturt.

This tragic event was tinged by mixed emotions over a possible Royal Visit. In early 1951 it was anticipated that a Royal Visit on a grand scale by the Royal Highnesses Princess Elizabeth and her husband Prince Philip would be made to Australia. The Royal Visit was planned firstly for March 1952 and later for early 1953, but because of the death of King George VI, and the subsequent Coronation, it was postponed until 1954.

== Preparations for the 1954 Royal Visit ==
In anticipation of the Royal Visit, and following overtures from Sergeant Instructor Jack Cawley, Commissioner Green authorised the formation of the Mounted Cadre, with effect June 1951, to form a Royal Escort and to cope with future requirements. Ivor Green subsequently had the honour, in March 1954, of accompanying Her Majesty Queen Elizabeth II when inspecting the Royal Escort of mounted police.

Green also initiated significant changes to the police uniforms, elements of which dated back to the Victorian era. This included designing a new police badge. His intention was that, if approved by the government, the new badge and uniforms would be issued just prior to the much-expected Royal Visit. He felt that the Brunswick star badge then on issue had no local significance and that a typically South Australian badge would add prestige to the police. He drafted a design based upon the State Badge of South Australia, which is a piping shrike, common name White-backed Magpie. The new badges were authorised to be worn from 8 December 1951, to coincide with the introduction of a new khaki summer uniform on the same date. Despite many uniform changes since that time, the emblem designed by Green, or variations thereof, prevails in use by the police to the present day.

Another innovation by Green was the establishment of the CIB Detective Training Course, the first of which was held over six weeks at Thebarton Barracks in April 1952.

== The 1954 Royal Visit to South Australia ==
The visit of Her Majesty the Queen and His Royal Highness the Duke of Edinburgh to Australia took place from 3 February to 1 April 1954. During their week visit to the State of South Australia, from 18 to 26 March, the Royal couple attended many events in Adelaide as well as visiting Whyalla, Port Lincoln, and Renmark. The state spared no expense in welcoming the Royal visitors and Green was personally responsible for their security.

According to one newspaper, Green's preparations were very thorough and included going over the routes of the Royal car, vetting houses along the way, and inspecting bridges and any locations where snipers may hide. When in public, the Royal couple were never out of his sight. When the Royals travelled by plane, Green took an advanced aircraft and was waiting for them on the tarmac.

Before the departure of the Queen, on 26 March 1954 she bestowed honours on the Governor and certain officials in gratitude for personal service. Ivor Bren Green, as Commissioner of Police during the 1954 Royal Visit, was awarded the Royal Victorian Order, Lieutenant (fourth class), post-nominal LVO.

== Medical Decline ==
Ivor Green suffered deteriorating ill health after the 1954 Royal Visit and so in January 1956 Brigadier John Gilbert McKinna was appointed by the Playford Government to the new rank of Deputy Commissioner to assist the administration of the police force. McKinna had earlier been requested to review the police service and so relations between the two were strained. Green was never a serving police officer and McKinna felt that under him the public service had an undue influence because they were being relied upon for strategic and organisational planning instead of experienced police officers.

== Death and Funeral ==
On the morning of 11 April 1957, whilst still holding office, Ivor Bren Green LVO collapsed and died at his Collinswood home while preparing to go to his office. He was aged 59 years. He was accorded a full police funeral, which proceeded to the North Road Cemetery where he was buried in Plot 8852, Path 49 South. His widow, Olive, survived him by 25 years, dying at age 91, and the couple are interred together.

Following the sudden death of Commissioner Ivor Green, Brigadier John McKinna was appointed Commissioner in July 1957. Just like Green, McKinna did not have a previous police career.
