= Murder Calls Australia =

Australian true crime television series

- Genre: Crime
- Presented by: Leila McKinnon
- Country of origin: Australia
- Original language: English
- No. of seasons: 1
- No. of episodes: 6

Production
- Production company: Screentime

Original release
- Network: Nine Network
- Release: February 15 – March 29, 2017

Murder Calls Australia is an Australian true-crime series that first screened on the Nine Network on 15 February 2017 hosted by Leila McKinnon. This series reveals murder cases which were solved through crucial phone calls which put the killers behind bars. It features calls from witnesses, the public, the perpetrators, even victims beyond the grave.

== Episodes ==
No.	Title	Original release date	Australian viewers
1	"Herman Rockefeller"	15 February 2017	611,000
2	"Kelly Hodge"	1 March 2017	442,000
3	"Stephen Dempsey & Ezzedine Bahmad"	8 March 2017	549,000
4	"Gabe Meyer"	15 March 2017	547,000
5	"Peter Shellard"	22 March 2017	N/A
6	"Margaret Tobin"	29 March 2017	N/A

== See also ==
- List of Australian television series
- Crime Investigation Australia
- Murder Uncovered
- Crime in Australia
