= Mount Lilydale Mercy College =

Location
- 120 Anderson Street; Lilydale, Victoria 3140; Australia
- 47.19181145536518°N 52.83756155037247°W

Information
- Type: Independent co-educational secondary school
- Motto: Latin: Omnia Cum Deo (All with God)
- Religious affiliations: Roman Catholic; Sisters of Mercy
- Founded: 1896
- Founder: Sisters of Mercy
- Principal: Philip A. Morison
- Teaching staff: 103.9 (on an FTE basis)
- Years: 7–12
- Gender: Co-educational
- Enrolment: 1,458 (2018)
- Campuses: 2 (McAuley and Barak)
- Houses: Carr, O'Neill, Frayne, Ryan, Maguire, Terry Dunn
- Colours: Blue and gold
- Nickname: MLMC
- Yearbook: Coolock
- Affiliations: Eastern Independent Schools of Melbourne, Roman Catholic Archdiocese of Melbourne
- Website: www.mlmc.vic.edu.au

Mount Lilydale Mercy College (commonly known as Mount Lilydale or MLMC) is a Roman Catholic co-educational secondary school located in the Melbourne suburb of Lilydale, Victoria, Australia, founded by the Sisters of Mercy in 1896. The College serves the needs over 1500 students.

== History ==
=== 1831–1841 ===
The Institute of the Sisters of Mercy was founded by Catherine McAuley in 1831 in Dublin, Ireland.

=== 1846–1896 ===
Fifteen years later, in 1846, the first Sisters of Mercy arrived in Perth from Ireland. One of these pioneering women was Ursula Frayne who brought with her the vision of Catherine that they should be living witnesses of God's mercy in a new world. The Sisters of Mercy continue to provide education, health care, social services and ministries across 43 countries today. In 1990, Pope John Paul II declared Catherine McAuley "Venerable".

Following the establishment of a convent at Mansfield in 1846, a branch house was opened in Lilydale in 1896. When the Sisters arrived in January of that year, neither the convent nor school had been prepared for them, but the local Parish Priest vacated his presbytery and, for the first four months, school was carried out in the basement of the presbytery. There were four nuns in charge at Lilydale, namely Mother Patrick Maguire, Mother Agnes Ryan, Sister Brigid Bradshaw and Sister Catherine Ford.

The Parish Priest, Rev A Hennessy bought a property of 33 acres and on 15 November 1896, the foundation stone of the convent and the boarding school was laid. As soon as the first stage of the building was ready, the Sisters took up residence on what is now known as Mount Lilydale Mercy College. The number of pupils increased rapidly and volunteer Sisters from Ireland were soon called for.

=== 1905–1944 ===
In 1905, Mount Lilydale College (as it was called then), was granted primary registration. In 1938, the high school received full recognition as a secondary college. From these beginnings, the College flourished as a primary, secondary, boarding and day school for students. In 1944, a two-roomed junior school was built nearby. Both were later demolished for construction of the existing College.

=== 1962–1975 ===
In April 1962, and in November 1965, the present north and south wings of the McAuley Campus were opened. In February 1964, the tennis courts were laid, and officially opened by Archbishop Knox. The Library and Science block were constructed in 1970. At that time, this new building marked the last stage of the development of Mount Lilydale Catholic Girls’ College, which, in 1974, boasted 339 secondary and 95 primary students, including 21 boarders.

During 1973 a committee was formed to address the need for development of a boys’ secondary school to meet the growing demands in the area. The decision was taken by the Sisters of Mercy to retain the presence of the Sisters of Mercy and for Mount Lilydale College to become coeducational.

Boarders ceased living at the College in 1974 and in February 1975 the first boys were enrolled and the primary section of the College began to be phased out.

=== 1976–today ===
On 17 November 1976, Bishop Perkins opened and blessed the first extension required for this new phase of the College development.

During the past 41 years there has been a major transformation in the College facilities with further building works proposed as a result of the new College Master Plan. Currently, Mount Lilydale Mercy College accepts students from Year 7 to Year 12.

=== Principals ===
Years	Name
1920–1925	Gertrude Power RSM
1932–1937	Gertrude Power RSM
1948–1957	Ursula Slater RSM
1969–1973	Gabrielle Jennings RSM
1976–1989	Beth Calthorpe RSM
1990–1995	Paul Goodfellow
1996–1998	Nancy Freddi
1999–2012	Bernard Dobson
2013–present	Philip A Morison

== Academic ==
=== Victorian Certificate of Education (VCE) ===
Mount Lilydale Mercy College offers the Victorian Certificate of Education (VCE) to students at Year 11 and 12 Level. High achieving Year 10 students are also given the opportunity to undertake one VCE subject at Year 11 level (Units 1 and 2). Mount Lilydale Mercy College offers an extensive range of VCE subjects, almost all of which are run each year due to the large size of the school.

=== Victorian Certificate of Applied Learning (VCAL) ===
The Victorian Certificate of Applied Learning (VCAL) is offered to Year 11 and 12 Students at the Intermediate and Senior Level.

=== Vocational Education and Training (VET) ===
Mount Lilydale Mercy College has a Vocational Education and Training in Schools program which has some courses offered at the College and some courses offered off campus through the Yarra Valley Vet Cluster and TAFE's such as Box Hill Institute and Swinburne University of Technology.

== Student life ==
Religious Education programs are run for students in Years 7-12.

Students can undertake a wide variety of student leadership positions while at the College, including class captains, prefects and membership of a student council.

== Controversies ==
Mount Lilydale Mercy College has experienced some controversies. In May 2015, the school ran a religious seminar that many year 12 students felt was "biased", "homophobic" and "sexist". The seminar, ran by a religious program called Focus on the Family Australia, affected one student to the point that she felt compelled to protest it by starting a petition, and contacting a journalist, who published an article critiquing the schools choice in what they teach their students.

In 2022, a media student's film featuring LGBTQ themes and imagery was denied from being shown at an exhibition meant to take place in October 2022. This incident was then mentioned in parliament and written about by The Age. The film was denied due to it not aligning with the institutions "catholic values".

In January 2023, the school experienced a large data breach in which up to 400 credit card numbers were stolen by "third party hackers". The breach included details of current and former parents whose information was still on file with the school. The school was notified of the hack on 11 January 2023 by the Australian Federal Police and notified parents in a letter send out on 30 January 2023.

== EISM ==
MLMC is a member of the Eastern Independent Schools of Melbourne (EISM).

=== EISM Premierships ===
MLMC has won the following EISM senior premierships.

Combined:

- Athletics – 1995
- Cross Country (3) – 1993, 1994, 2022
- Swimming – 2022

Boys:

- Badminton (5) – 2002, 2003, 2004, 2005, 2008
- Basketball (10) – 1990, 1991, 1992, 1993, 1994, 2001, 2009, 2011, 2012, 2013
- Cricket (6) – 2000, 2002, 2007, 2009, 2012, 2019
- Cross Country (3) – 1993, 1994, 2004
- Football (7) – 1992, 1993, 1994, 2002, 2009, 2012, 2013
- Golf (2) – 2002, 2007, 2011
- Hockey (4) – 1997, 1998, 1999, 2001
- Soccer – 1998
- Softball (2) – 2010, 2022
- Swimming – 2022
- Table Tennis (2) – 1998, 2005
- Tennis (5) – 1989, 1991, 1992, 1998, 2003
- Ultimate Frisbee (3) – 2021, 2022, 2023
- Volleyball (2) – 1991, 1992

Girls:

- Badminton (5) – 2004, 2005, 2006, 2007, 2008
- Basketball (13) – 1972, 1983, 1984, 1989, 1991, 1995, 1996, 1997, 1998, 1999, 2000, 2009, 2018
- Cricket (6) – 2001, 2002, 2003, 2004, 2005, 2009
- Cross Country (9) – 1977, 1978, 1979, 1990, 1991, 1992, 1993, 1994, 2022
- Football (8) – 2002, 2003, 2010, 2011, 2012, 2017, 2018, 2022
- Hockey (2) – 2004, 2005
- Indoor Cricket (3) – 2008, 2016, 2018
- Netball (10) – 1979, 1982, 1986, 1988, 1989, 1991, 1995, 1996, 2009, 2010
- Soccer (11) – 2003, 2004, 2005, 2006, 2007, 2008, 2010, 2011, 2012, 2013, 2014
- Softball (8) – 1984, 1998, 1999, 2009, 2010, 2011, 2015, 2021, 2023, 2024
- Swimming (2) – 2013, 2022
- Table Tennis (2) – 1987, 1994
- Tennis (12) – 1985, 1986, 1989, 1998, 1999, 2000, 2001, 2003, 2006, 2008, 2009, 2017
- Touch Rugby – 2008
- Ultimate Frisbee (5) – 2017, 2018, 2021, 2022, 2023
- Volleyball – 1986

MLMC has won the following EISM Year 9 premierships.

Year 9 Boys:

- Badminton – 2010
- Basketball (3) – 2010, 2021, 2023
- Cricket (3) – 2010, 2022, 2023
- Football (3) – 2014, 2019, 2022
- Indoor Cricket – 2022
- Indoor Soccer – 2010
- Lawn Bowls – 2016
- Netball (4) – 2013, 2016, 2017, 2019
- Soccer (2) – 2010, 2023
- Softball (3) – 2010, 2012, 2013
- Tennis – 2018
- Ultimate Frisbee (2) – 2018, 2019
- Volleyball – 2023

Year 9 Girls:

- Basketball (3) – 2018, 2022, 2023
- Football (7) – 2010, 2011, 2013, 2015, 2016, 2017, 2022
- Hockey (2) – 2013, 2015
- Indoor Cricket (4) – 2011, 2015, 2019, 2022
- Indoor Soccer - 2023
- Lawn Bowls – 2013
- Netball (5) – 2010, 2012, 2016, 2019, 2023
- Soccer (6) – 2010, 2014, 2015, 2016, 2019, 2023
- Softball – 2022
- Table Tennis (3) – 2017, 2018, 2019
- Tennis (4) – 2012, 2015, 2016, 2019
- Touch Rugby – 2022
- Ultimate Frisbee (7) – 2010, 2011, 2016, 2017, 2018, 2019, 2022
- Volleyball (4) – 2010, 2012, 2015, 2023

== Notable alumni ==
- Kyle Adnam – basketballer
- James Merlino – politician
- Margaret Julia Tobin – psychiatrist
- Aaron Violi – politician
- Emerson Woods – AFLW Professional Player for the Carlton Football Club
- Jason Moloney - Boxer
- Troy Simmonds - AFL Football player (Melbourne, Fremantle and Richmond)

== See also ==
- List of schools in Victoria
- List of high schools in Victoria
- Victorian Certificate of Education
