= Margaret Julia Tobin =

Australian psychiatrist (1952-2002)

Margaret Tobin
- Born: Margaret Tobin; 1952; United Kingdom
- Died: 14 October 2002 (aged 49–50); Adelaide, Australia
- Education: Mount Lilydale Mercy College; Melbourne University
- Occupation: Psychiatrist

Margaret Julia Tobin (1952 – 14 October 2002) was a psychiatrist and leader of Australian mental health services reform. She was the victim of a murder committed by Eric Gassy, a former psychiatrist whom she had played a role in removing from medical practice some years prior.

== Early life and education ==
Margaret Julia Tobin was born in 1952 in the UK, and was brought to Melbourne, Victoria, Australia by her parents in 1954. She was the eldest of eight children.

She graduated from Mount Lilydale Mercy College in 1970 and received a scholarship to study medicine at Melbourne University in 1978.

== Australian mental health service reforms ==
Tobin completed her training in psychiatry in 1986 and, as a psychiatrist, took on leadership roles and became a mental health services manager in Victoria. Around this time, widespread corruption, abuse and neglect within Victorian mental health institutions came to light through several inquiries. Tobin led positive change and instigated reform in response to these findings in Willsmere, Melbourne; Lakeside Hospital and Aradale Hospital, Ballarat; and Ararat Hospital.

This led to her appointment at St George Hospital in Sydney in 1993 to lead a similar rejuvenation of mental health services in the city. After this she was appointed as head of mental health services for South Australia.

== Eric Gassy ==
In 1994, Tobin wrote to the New South Wales Medical Board requesting the evaluation of fitness to practice of one of the staff specialists at St George's, Eric Gassy, following a period of extended sick leave. Gassy had at one point acted as director of the mental health unit at St George's. He was never formally appointed due to his paranoid behaviour, conflicts with senior nursing staff, and a reputation for propositioning young female staff. No formal action had been taken prior to Tobin's request for evaluation.

Psychiatrists involved in the evaluation disagreed regarding Gassy's condition, and likely due in part to this, and likely due in part to his lack of insight, appropriate treatment or help was not available to him via the mental health service systems of the time. As a result of this he was deregistered as a medical practitioner.

== Death ==
Eight years later, Tobin had become the director of mental health services for South Australia. On 14 October 2002, she was returning to her office when Eric Gassy shot her four times. She died shortly after arriving at hospital. Directly after the shooting, there was immediate concern that the motive had been to halt the ongoing mental health reform process. Prompt security measures were taken to protect staff and patients at Glenside Psychiatric Hospital, as well as the Premier and Health Minister.

== Honours and commemorations ==
Following her death, Dr Tobin and her legacy of mental health reform and health service leadership was honoured and commemorated in a number of different ways, including:

- The Royal Australasian College of Medical Administrators renamed their Challenge Award, presented to the highest-calibre 12-minute candidate presentation at their annual conference, to the Margaret Tobin Challenge Award in December 2002.
- Lister House, North Terrace, designed by F. Kenneth Milne in 1928, was renamed Tobin House in 2002.
- In Hindmarsh Square, Adelaide, there is a tree commemorative plaque in memory of Tobin.
- In February 2003, construction began on the Margaret Tobin Centre, an acute mental health building at the Flinders Medical Centre in Adelaide.
- The South Australian Regional Local Health Network runs scholarships for employees of their six regional local health networks undertaking postgraduate study. The Margaret Tobin SA Rural Postgraduate Mental Health Scholarship is offered for those studying in the field of mental health.
- The Royal Australian and New Zealand College of Psychiatrists awards The Margaret Tobin Award to the college Fellow who has made the most significant contribution to administrative psychiatry over the preceding five years. The recipient is invited to present the 'Margaret Tobin Oration' keynote address.
- Induction onto the Mercy honour roll by Mount Lilydale Mercy College in 2017.

== Media ==
- Book: Melissa Sweet, 2006. Inside Madness: How One Woman's Passionate Drive to Reform the Mental Health System Ended in Tragedy. Macmillan Australia
- TV series episode: Michael Venables, 2017. Murder Calls Australia. (Season 1, episode 6) Margaret Tobin. Nine Network.
