= John McKinna =

Australian brigadier and police commissioner

- Born: 11 December 1906; Goodwood, South Australia
- Died: 28 January 2000 (aged 93); Adelaide, South Australia
- Military career
- Allegiance: Australia
- Branch: Australian Army
- Service years: 1937–1961
- Rank: Brigadier
- Commands: 9th Brigade (1952–55); 10th Battalion (1948–52); 25th Battalion (1944–45)
- Conflicts: Second World War
- Awards: Companion of the Order of St Michael and St George; Commander of the Order of the British Empire; Distinguished Service Order; Lieutenant of the Royal Victorian Order; Efficiency Decoration
- Other work: Commissioner of the South Australia Police (1957–72)

Brigadier John Gilbert McKinna CMG, CBE, DSO, LVO, ED (11 December 1906 – 28 January 2000) was a senior officer in the Australian Army during the Second World War. He was the Police Commissioner for South Australia between July 1957 and June 1972.
