= Gill Hicks =

Australian activist and motivational speaker

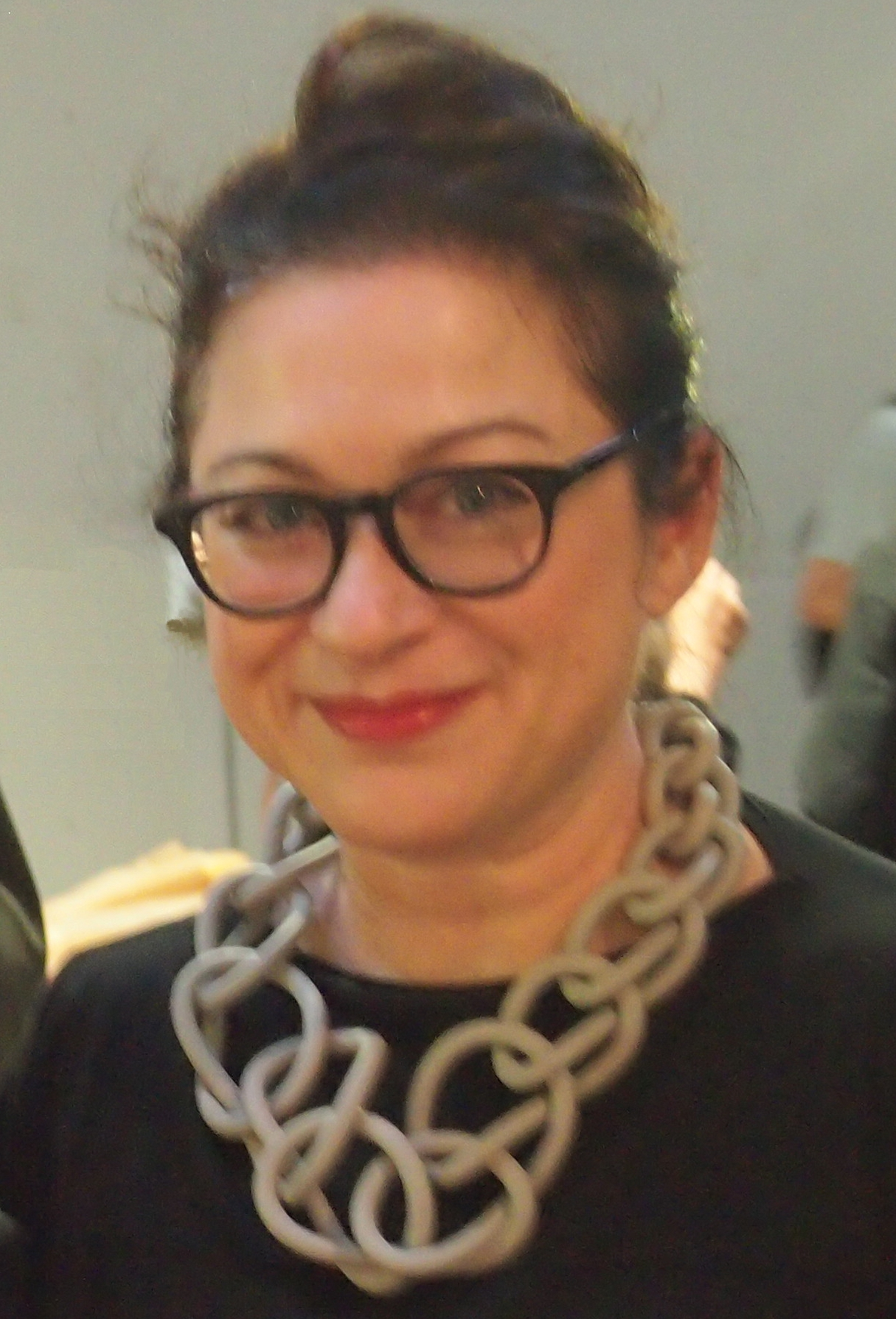
- Gill Hicks, 2016
- Born: 1968
- Occupations: motivational speaker for peace, author, curator
- Known for: survivor of 2005 London bombings

Gillian Claire Hicks, AM MBE, born 1968, is an Australian motivational speaker, author, curator, and trustee for several cultural organisations. She is the founder of the London-based not-for-profit M.A.D for Peace. She began her career as a speaker in the wake of the 7 July 2005 London bombings. She was the last living victim rescued. Both her legs were amputated below the knee, and her injuries were so severe that she was initially not expected to live. She was admitted to St Thomas' Hospital without a name, identified only as "One Unknown".

The Adelaide, South Australia-born Hicks has lived in London since 1992. She is former Publishing Director of the architecture, design and contemporary culture magazine Blueprint. Director of the multi-disciplinary design and publishing group Dangerous Minds, and Head of Curation at the UK's Design Council.

Her first book, One Unknown, was shortlisted in 2008 for the Mind Book of the Year. In 2008 she also carried the Olympic torch in Canberra. Hicks was named South Australian of the Year in November 2014.

Gillian Hicks was made a Member of the Order of Australia (AM) in the 2016 Australia Day Honours list "for significant service to the promotion of peace in the community through public engagement, education and network building initiatives".

== Personal life ==
Hicks married art historian Joe Kerr on 10 December 2005 and separated in 2009. In 2011 she met industrial designer Karl Falzon and returned to live in Australia, giving birth to her daughter Amelie in 2013.

== Awards and honours ==
- 2015 South Australia's Australian of the Year
- Ambassador for Peace Direct (Best New Charity), 2005
- Advocate for the Leonard Cheshire Disability, 2006
- MBE for her services to charity in the Queen's New Year's Honours List for 2009
- UK's Australian Woman of the Year 2009
- Honorary Doctor of Science from Kingston University, 2013, Faculty of Health, Social Care and Education, in recognition of her determination to overcome her injuries, and of her work raising awareness of disability.
- Recipient of the Iman Wa Amal Special Judges Award at the 10th Annual Muslim News Awards for Excellence in March 2010
- Listed in the Who's Who of Australian Women, 2011
- Honorary Doctorate in Philosophy from the University of South Australia
