= South Australia Police Historical Society =

South Australia Police Historical Society Incorporated
- Established: 1977
- Website: www.sapolicehistory.org

The South Australia Police Historical Society Incorporated is a volunteer-based incorporated association with the aim of preserving and promoting the history of the South Australia Police and of law enforcement in South Australia.

== Foundation ==
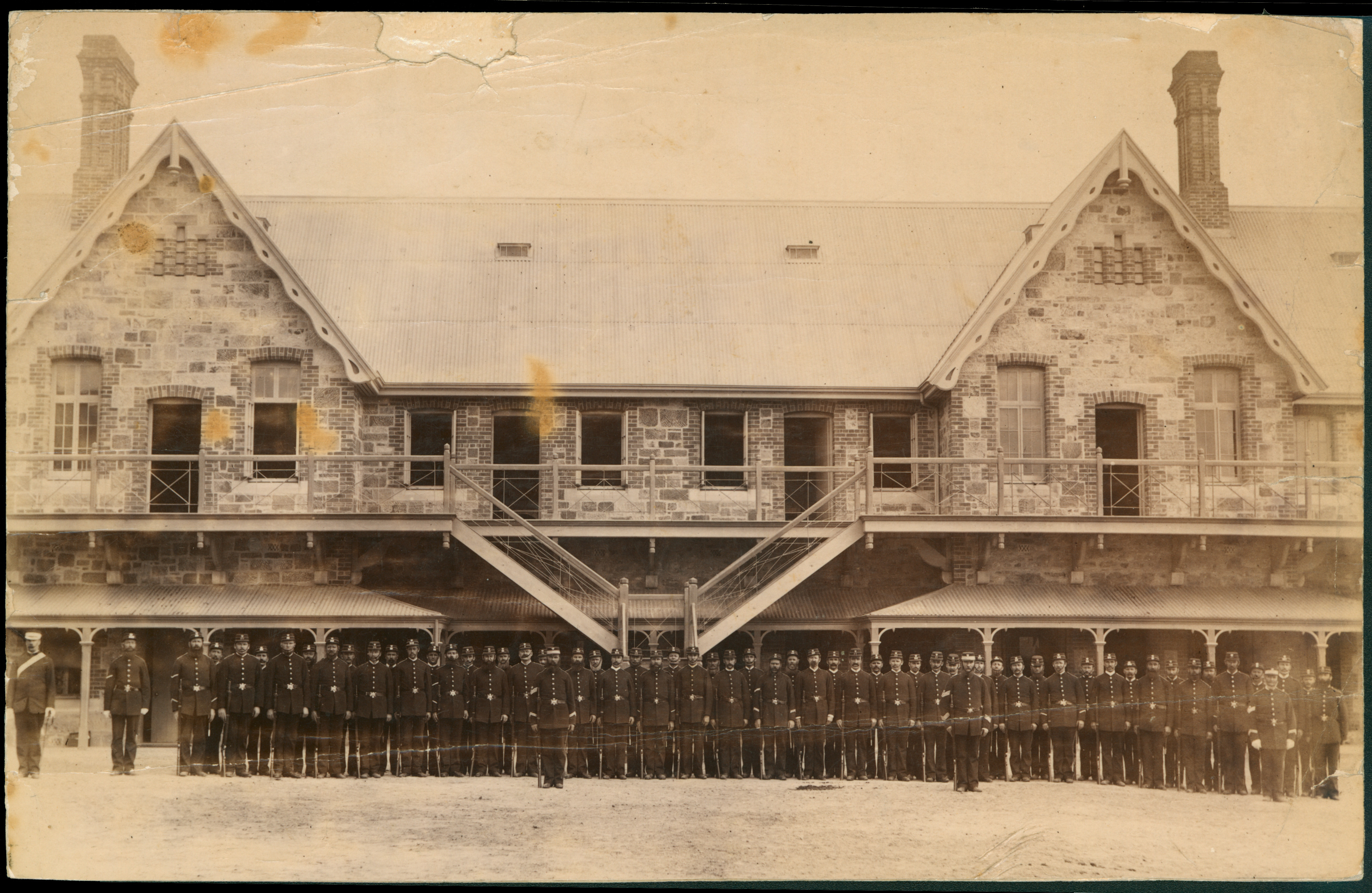
Mounted Police Barracks in 1890, former site of the society

The society was founded in 1977. For some years it occupied rooms at the former Mounted Police Barracks, North Terrace, Adelaide, and then from 1996 at the former Thebarton Police Barracks complex, 1 Gaol Road, Adelaide, within Park 27 of the Adelaide Park Lands.

As of 2024, the society and museum moved to the former AAMI state office on the corner of King William Street and Sturt Street. This was after the State Heritage listed buildings were demolished to make way for the new Women’s and Children’s Hospital.

The society works closely with the South Australia Police (SAPOL) and ever since its foundation the serving Commissioner of Police has agreed to hold the position of honorary patron. Membership is open to all, police and non-police.

== Collections and activities ==
Activities focus on recording, preserving, and promoting the history and heritage of the South Australia Police and its role within the South Australian community. Monthly meetings feature guest speakers on related topics. Police Foundation Day is a significant event, held annually on 28 April, commemorating the anniversary of the date when SAPOL was founded in 1838.

At the former Thebarton Police Barracks, the museum was spread over five galleries and contained policing objects and uniforms, historical and recent. One of these galleries was a vehicle collection displaying police transport through the ages. Another gallery exhibited the plaster cast made in 1949 of an unknown man's head and chest from the Tamam Shud case.

Others activities include maintaining a photographic and documentary archive and database, a library, conducting an annual open day, and attending community events and re-enactments in support of local police activities. Historical research on police personnel and establishments is provided on a fee for service basis. The not-for-profit organisation is self-funded, mainly through conducting police museum tours and sales of books and memorabilia.

== Distinctive themes ==
In addition to the usual police history narratives the society keenly promotes the many elements unique to South Australia. SAPOL was founded on 28 April 1838 under the command of Inspector Henry Inman. Although Australia had several older individual policing services, that of South Australia was the first to have authority over an entire colony. It is therefore credited as being the third oldest centrally controlled police force in the world after the London Metropolitan Police (1829) and Dublin (1836) forces.

In 1852-53 SAPOL conducted a gold escort service between the Victorian goldfields and Adelaide which revived the economy of South Australia.

In 1880 SAPOL were the first Australian police to regularly use camels for patrolling in the harsh outback. Along with horses (and later, motor vehicles), this continued right through to 1951.

SAPOL can also claim to have, since 1915, the first women police in the then British Empire to be sworn in with equal pay and conditions to male police.

From 1868 to 1911 the Northern Territory was policed by SAPOL.

== Magazine – Hue and Cry ==
The very earliest policing in South Australia was based on the process of hue and cry which relied on citizen volunteers. In 1852 SAPOL issued an official publication titled Hue and Cry containing details of crimes and wanted people. In 1861 this was renamed the Police Gazette, published weekly for well over 100 years. When in 1979 the Society commenced publication of an official newsletter it was titled Hue and Cry to commemorate the original. It is today a bi-monthly magazine circulated to all Society members.
