= M.A.D for Peace =

M.A.D for Peace is a not-for-profit organisation based in London, England, which has one main focus: communicating to the general public the importance of our individual responsibility in creating a world in which extreme conflict and its human consequences are ended.

== Background ==
M.A.D (Making a Difference) for Peace was founded in 2007 by Dr Gill Hicks MBE FRSA, survivor of the 7 July 2005 London bombings, who lost both her legs that day. She discovered a great inner strength to not only fight for her life but to learn to walk again using prosthetic legs. Truly grateful to be alive, Hicks now devotes her time to making her life count, to really making a difference.

At M.A.D, peace is a daily activity, a daily consciousness. Drawing on their background in the arts and creative industries, Hicks and her co-director Claire Sawford devise projects which are participatory, encourage people to interact and together to ensure that peace becomes as instinctive an action as recycling and caring about the environment have become. Just one person’s positive actions within their own community, when multiplied, have a significant effect nationally and globally, and leave a ‘lasting footprint’.

M.A.D’s work is focused in three key areas - Public Engagement, Education and Bridging Divides in Communities - at local, national and international level.

== Projects ==
Each M.A.D project embeds one or more of the five key messages from Gill’s own story of survival: Identity, The Brilliance of Humanity, Determination, Optimism and Choice. Specific objectives are incorporated to meet the needs of each particular community.

A simple and effective way that M.A.D get people involved is to ask people to see the ‘other’ point of view, encouraging greater understanding and the willingness to resolve conflict and division.

M.A.D’s first Public Engagement project, WALKTALK, was devised to encourage people of all ages and from all walks of life – who might otherwise never have the opportunity to meet - to come together and walk and, most importantly, talk about their beliefs and focus on everything we have in common. Hicks and a small core team including two co-developer organisations from Yorkshire, and with the support of volunteers from the London Ambulance Service, walked over 250 miles from Millennium Square, Leeds, to Trafalgar Square, London, in summer 2008. Their enthusiasm and determination was matched by local communities, creating a lasting footprint in each community through which they passed.

The message with M.A.D’s second major project, launched in Trafalgar Square on 8 May 2009, was equally strong and simple, asking people to literally DRAW A LINE - whether a human chain with friends and colleagues, an intricate piece of artwork or a simple scribble on a sticky note stuck onto the fridge – and use this as a daily reminder that change and real peace starts from within. The project has been extended as part of M.A.D’s work with schools all over the world as Draw A Line: School to School.

In September 2010, M.A.D launched an international design competition with TafeSA, Technical Centre for Printing and Visual Communication in South Australia, entitled Playing for Peace, which is open to design students under the age of 21.
