= South Australia Police =

Police force of the Australian state of South Australia

- Badge of the South Australia Police

- Flag of the South Australia Police
- Motto: Safer Communities

Agency overview
- Formed: 28 April 1838
- Employees: 6,134 (2023)
- Annual budget: $1.27 billion (2025-26)

Jurisdictional structure
- Operations jurisdiction: South Australia, Australia
- South Australia Police jurisdiction
- Area: 1,043,514 square kilometres (402,903 sq mi)
- Population: 1,767,247 (2020)
- Legal jurisdiction: As per operations jurisdiction
- Governing body: Government of South Australia
- Constituting instrument: Police Act 1998
- General nature: Civilian police

Operational structure
- Overseen by: Independent Commission Against Corruption
- Headquarters: 100 Angas Street; Adelaide SA 5000; 34°55′36.07″S 138°36′3.25″E
- Minister responsible: Michael Brown, Minister for Police, Emergency Services and Correctional Services
- Agency executive: Grant Stevens, APM, Commissioner
- Units: List: Major Crime Investigation Branch; Special Tasks & Rescue Group; Security Response Section; Operations Section; Water Operations Unit; Dog Operations Unit; Mounted Operations Unit; Traffic Services Support Branch; Forensic Services Branch

Facilities
- Stations: 138

Website
- www.police.sa.gov.au

The South Australia Police (SAPOL) is the police force of the Australian state of South Australia. SAPOL is an independent statutory agency of the Government of South Australia directed by the Commissioner of Police, who reports to the Minister for Police. SAPOL provides general duties policing, highway patrol, criminal investigation and emergency coordination services throughout the state. SAPOL is also responsible for road safety advocacy and education, and maintains the South Australian Road Safety Centre.

As of November 2023 the commissioner of police is Grant Stevens, who has been in the role since July 2015.

== History ==
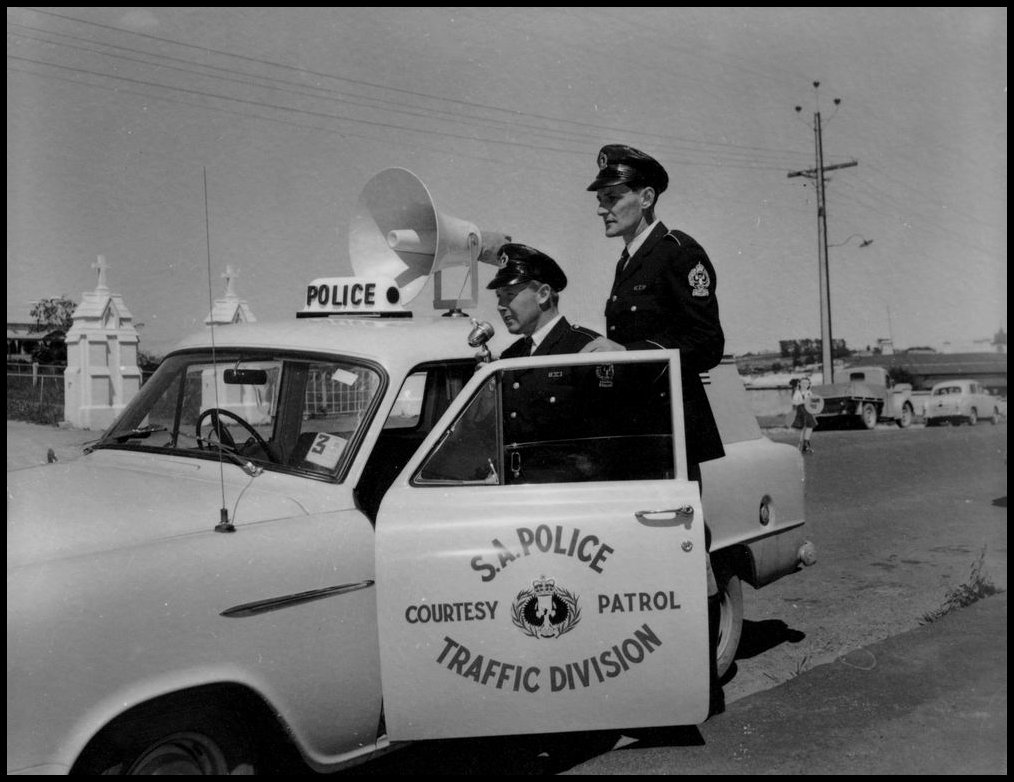
1959 SAPOL Traffic Division Patrol Vehicle

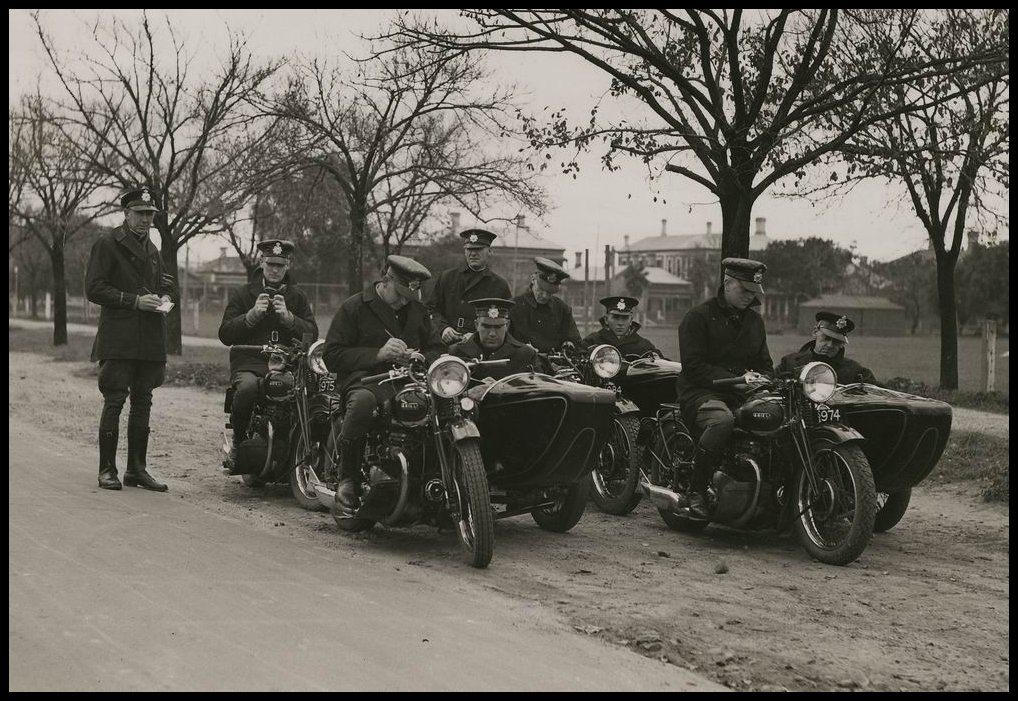
SAPOL Force in 1938

=== Early years ===
Formally established on 28 April 1838 under the command of Inspector Henry Inman, the force is the oldest in Australasia and is the third oldest organised police force in the world. The first force in the colony of South Australia consisted of 10 mounted constables and 10 foot constables.

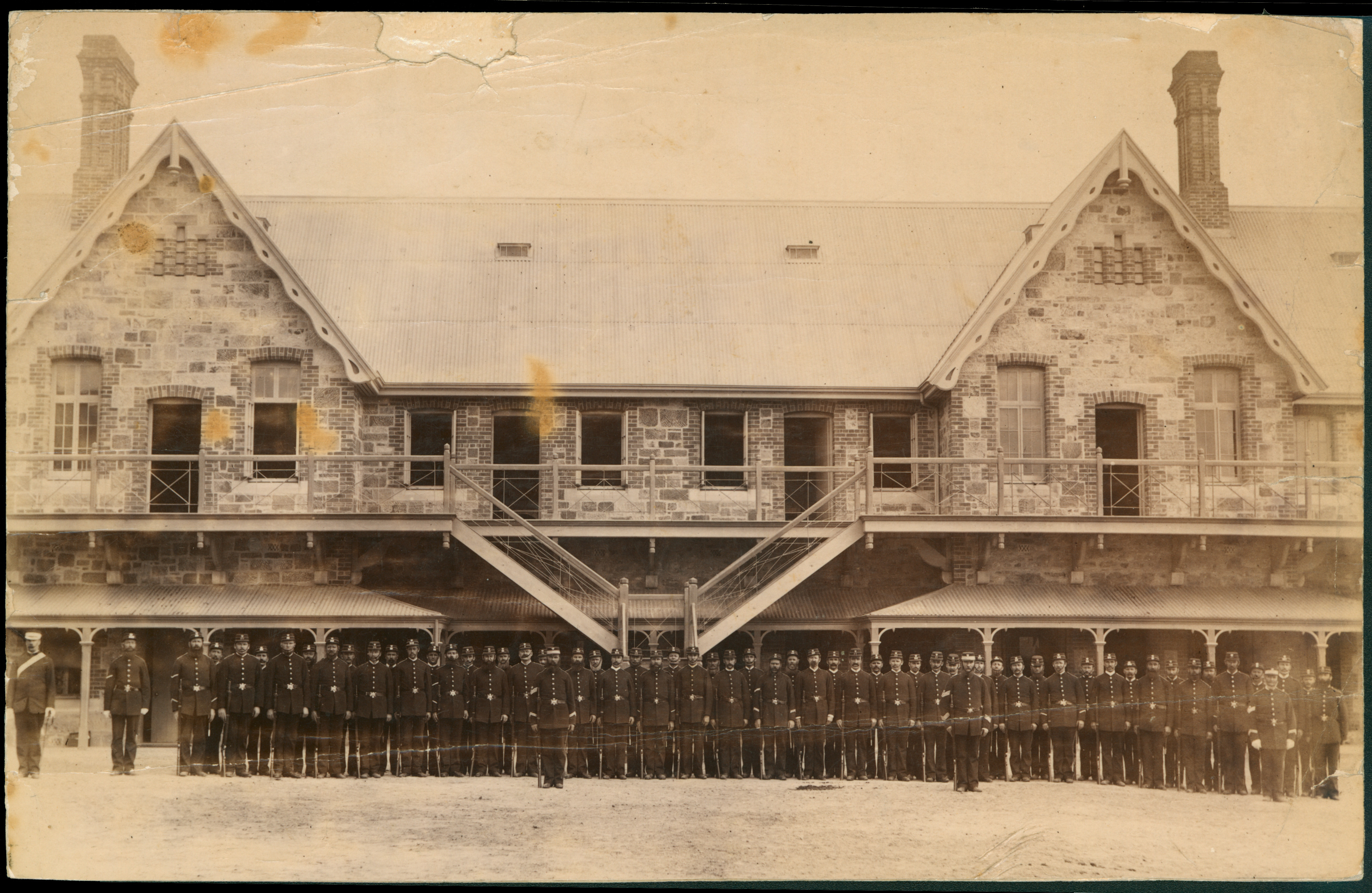
Mounted Police Barracks in 1890 with policemen on parade

In 1840, Major Thomas Shouldham O'Halloran was appointed as the first official Commissioner of Police. At this time, SAPOL consisted of one Superintendent, two Inspectors, three Sergeants and 47 Constables divided into foot and mounted sections. Between 1840 and 1842 O'Halloran led three "punitive expeditions" against Aboriginal people on the Coorong, at Port Lincoln, and on the Murray. This included reprisals following the Maria massacre where O'Halloran was sent out with instructions by Governor Gawler to execute "any number, not exceeding three" of the Aboriginal people identified to be involved.

The first police officer in Australia to be charged with murder was South Australia Police Force first-class mounted constable William Wiltshire. He is believed to be responsible for the deaths of more than 13 Aboriginal people, however his murder charge was eventually acquitted.

From 1848 to 1867, SAPOL also served as the state fire and rescue service, until the precursor of the South Australian Metropolitan Fire Service was formed. They also supplied the Civil Ambulance Service from 1880 to 1954, when it was taken over by the St John Ambulance Service.

=== Female officers ===
In 1915, the first two female police officers, Kate Cocks and Annie Ross, were appointed. This was six months after New South Wales commenced with two officers. It had been said "it is easier to get into heaven than to join the women police". Cocks retired in 1935, and was the officer in charge of the largest female detachment of all Australian state police departments of 14, which was double the size of the next-nearest of New South Wales.

In 1929, officer Daisy Curtis studied on a scholarship abroad to examine the 'methods of protecting women and children'. This included travels to the jurisdictions of Great Britain, Norway, Sweden, Germany, the Netherlands, the United States of America, and New Zealand. (New Zealand did not get its first female officer until 1941.)

In 1999, SAPOL was the first Australian policing jurisdiction to appoint a female police officer, Senior Constable Jane Kluzek, to a tactical group.

In 2015, Linda Williams was made the first Deputy Commissioner of police.

=== Ministers for Police (2000s – Present) ===
- Paul Holloway (2002 – 2009)
- Kevin Foley (2009 – 2011)
- Michael O'Brien (2013 – 2014)
- Tony Piccolo (Feb 2014 – Jan 2016)
- Peter Malinauskas (Jan 2016 – Sep 2017)
- Chris Picton (Sep 2017 – Mar 2018)
- Corey Wingard (Mar 2018 – Jul 2020)
- Vincent Tarzia (Jul 2020 – Mar 2022)
- Joe Szakacs (Mar 2022 – Apr 2024)
- Dan Cregan (Apr 2024 – Jan 2025)
- Stephen Mullighan (Jan 2025 – Sep 2025)
- Blair Boyer (Sep 2025 – Mar 2026)

=== Timeline of initiatives ===
- 1893: Introduced bicycles for metropolitan and country foot police
- 1893: Pioneered the fingerprint system in Australia
- 1987: The first Australian police service to introduce videotaping of "suspect person" interviews
- 1993: Introduced Operation Nomad, as a policing initiative to reduce the threat of bushfires
- 1996: Crime Stoppers launched
- 2000s: Established neighbourhood policing teams in various metropolitan areas
- 2011: The first police jurisdiction in Australia to launch its own web platform connecting mobile phone users to the latest police news

== Responsibilities ==
=== Commissioner ===
The commissioner of police, in addition to leading SAPOL, also serves as the State Emergency Coordinator and is responsible for major emergency response and command and control of major disasters, including bushfires, floods, and earthquakes. Under an emergency declaration, the commissioner has extraordinary authority to create rules and regulations that may be enforced by police, for a limited time. Due to these laws, Commissioner Grant Stevens became a central figure in South Australia's response to the COVID-19 pandemic. The powers of South Australia Police are defined in the Police Act 1998.

As of November 2023 Stevens is still in the position.

=== SAPOL ===
In addition to general law enforcement such as patrols and investigations, SAPOL is responsible for other services throughout the state. These include:

- Operating emergency assistance call centres for police, 000 (emergency telephone number)
- Non-urgent assistance call centres, 131 444 (non-emergency telephone number)
- Coordinating and managing emergency disaster response
- Road safety advocacy and education
- Registration and licensing of firearms
- Liquor licensing enforcement
- Security of public buildings and officials
- Police prosecutions
- Victim support services

== Organisation ==
SAPOL's structure consists of various units. Through the chain of command, all units are accountable to the Commissioner. Services are the largest units, and are headed by a sworn assistant commissioner, or for areas which are not policing specific, such as information technology, a civilian Director. Services are directly accountable to either the Commissioner or Deputy Commissioner.

Services within metropolitan Adelaide are based on four different districts: Northern, Eastern Western and Southern. Each district has its own localised branch that provides specialised services or assistance, such as Criminal Investigation Branch (CIB), family violence, and intelligence sections. There are seven Regions for remote and country areas within the remainder of the state.

=== Districts and Regions ===
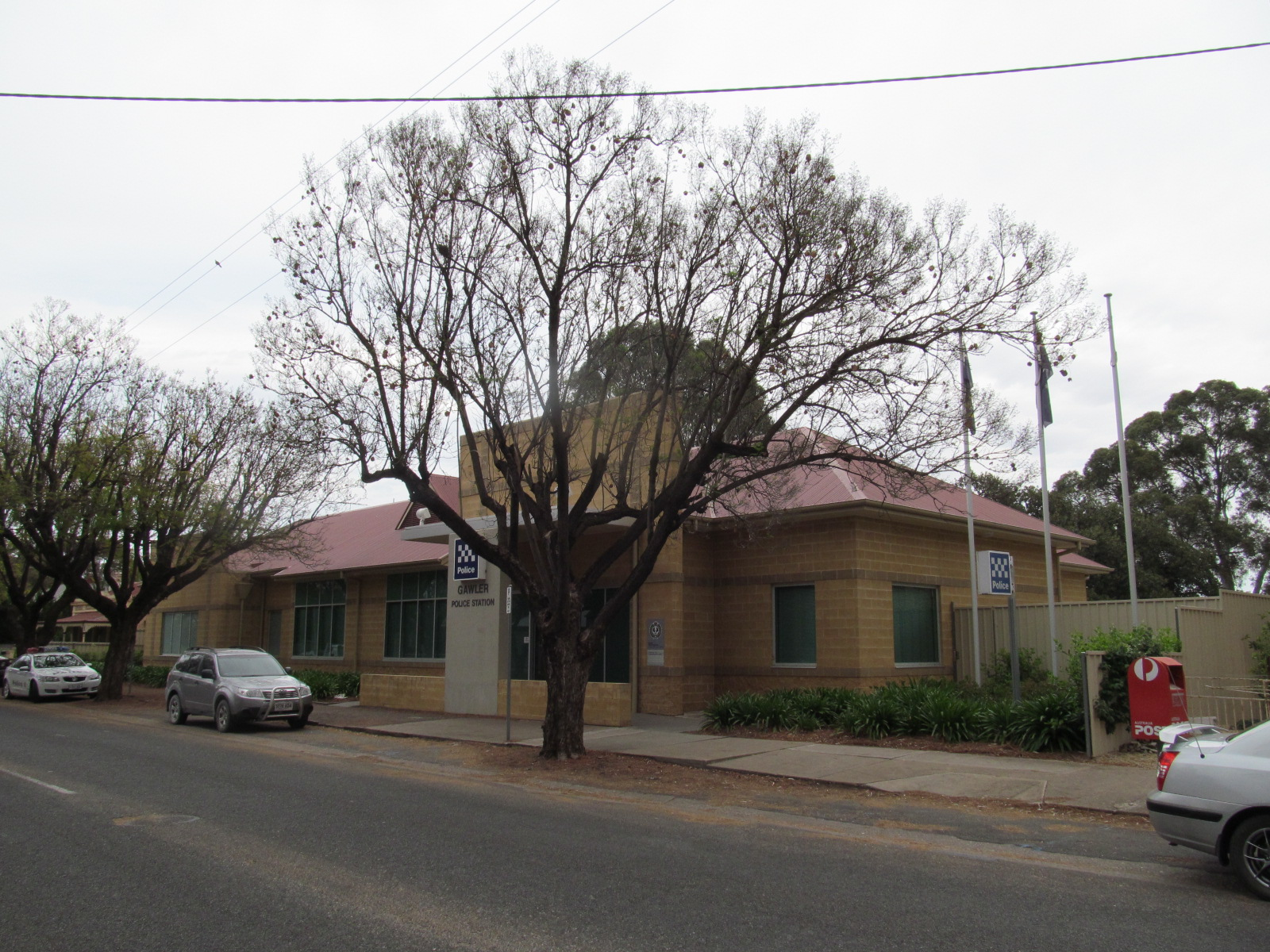
Gawler Police Station

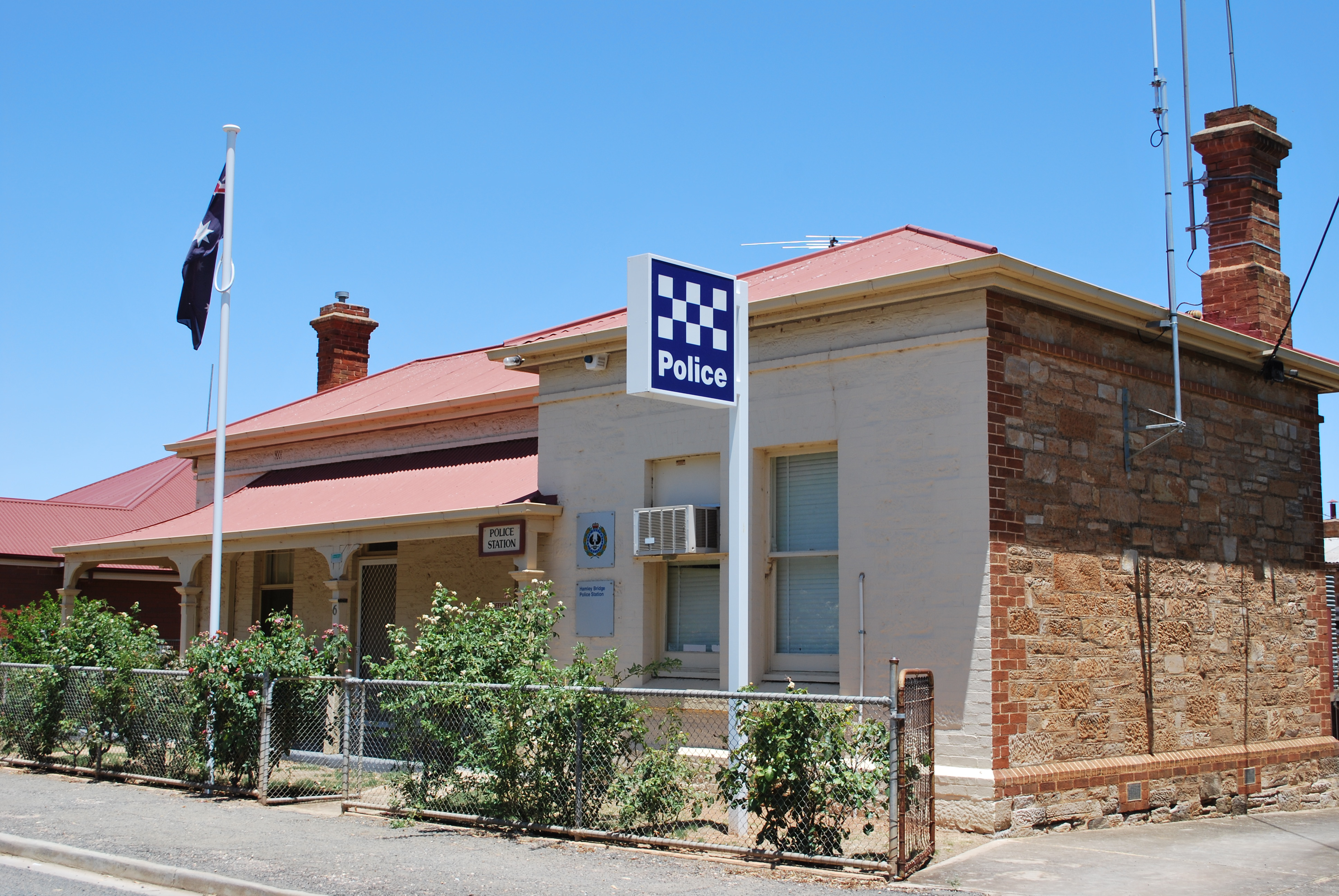
Hamley Bridge Police Station

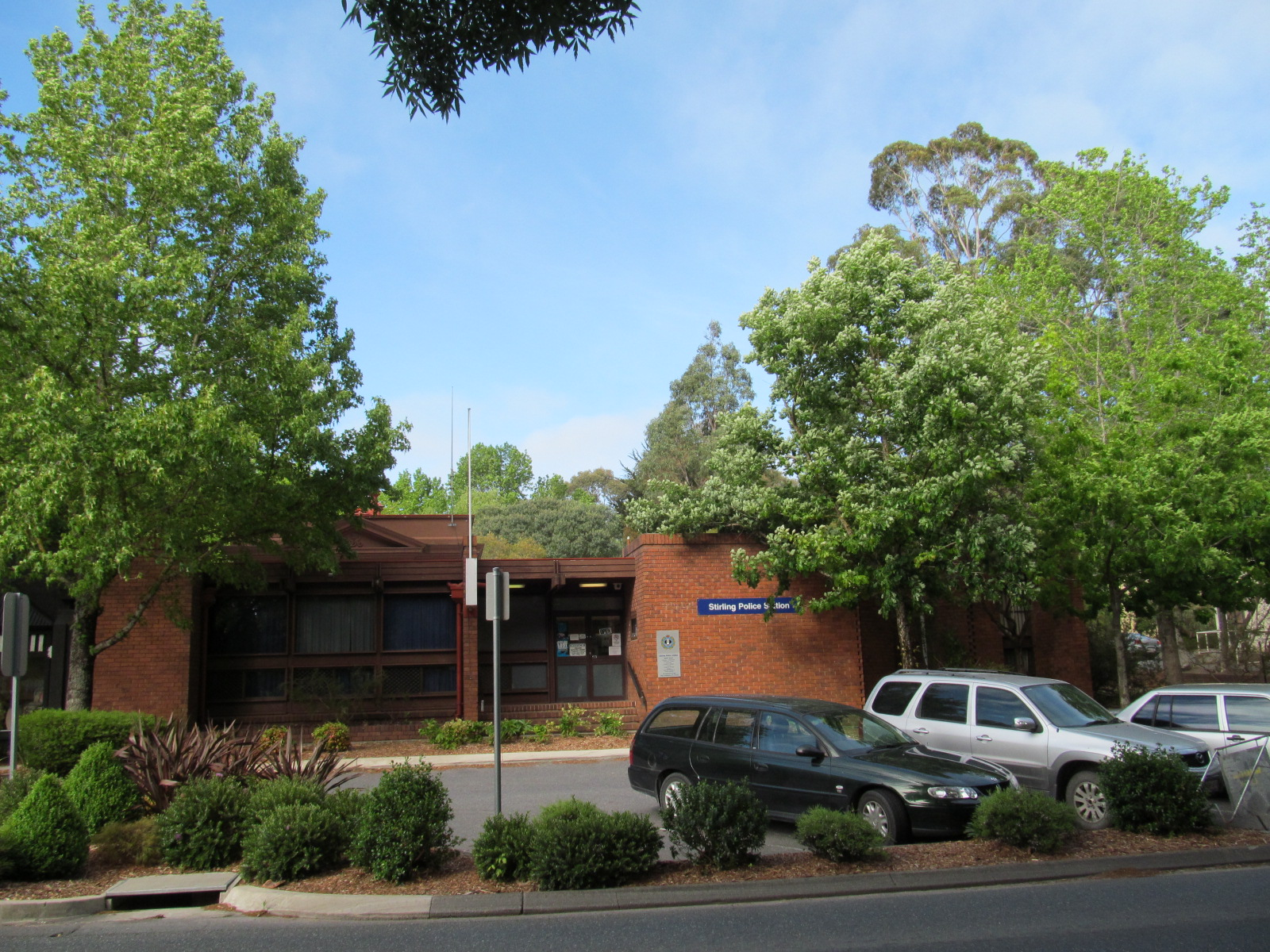
Stirling Police Station

Districts and Regions are the main organisational unit to provide policing services to the public. A district (metro Northern, Southern, Eastern and Western) and region (country Barossa, Eyre / Western, Far North, Hills Fleurieu, Limestone Coast, Murray Mallee and Yorke Mid North) contains a number of police stations, as well as specialist services to support frontline police such as detectives, crime scene investigators and traffic police. Each LSA has a designated office known as a 'Complex' where majority of operations in the area start. The LSA then have smaller community police stations for quick policing access.

Metropolitan Districts and Regions are divided between the Metropolitan Operations Service and the State Operations Service, which each have their own coordination branch and some other additional functions.

==== Metropolitan Districts (Metropolitan Operations Service) ====
- Eastern Districts
- Northern District
- Southern District
- Western District
- Metropolitan Operations Service Coordination Branch
- Public Transport Safety Section

==== Regions (State Operations Service) ====
- Barossa Region
- Eyre and Western Region
- Far North Region
- Hills Fleurieu Region
- Limestone Coast Region
- Murray Mallee Region
- Yorke Mid North Region
- State Operations Service Coordination Branch
- State Operations Support Branch
- Traffic Services Branch (Highway Patrol)

=== Security and Emergency Management Service ===
Security and Emergency Management is led by an Assistant Commissioner.

- Security and Emergency Management Service Coordination Branch
- Communications Group
- Police Security Services Branch
- Security Advice Section
- Special Tasks and Rescue Group (STAR Group)
  - STAR Group Police Tactical Group
  - Dog Operations Unit
  - Mounted Operations Unit
  - Water Operations Unit
  - PolAir
  - Bomb Squad
  - Negotiators
- Security Response Section
- State Protective Security Branch (Police Security Officers)

=== Operations Support Service ===
Operations Support is led by an Assistant Commissioner.

- Operations Support Service Coordination Branch
- Firearms Branch
- Forensic Services Branch
- Licensing Enforcement Branch
- Prosecution Services Branch
- State Intelligence Branch

=== Crime Service ===
Crime Service is led by an Assistant Commissioner, usually a former Detective.

- Serious Crime Coordination Branch
- Financial and Cybercrime Investigation Branch
- Investigation Support Branch
- Major Crime Investigation Branch
- Public Protection Branch
- Serious and Organised Crime Branch

=== Governance and Capability Service ===
Governance and Capability is led by an Assistant Commissioner.

- Governance and Capability Service
- Coordination Branch
- Commissioner's Support Branch
- Communication and Engagement Branch
- Ethical and Professional Standards Branch
- Office of the General Counsel

=== Other services ===
Each administrative service is led by a civilian Executive Director.

- Business Service
- Information Systems and Technology Service
- People Culture and Wellbeing

== Ranking and structure ==
=== Police Officers ===
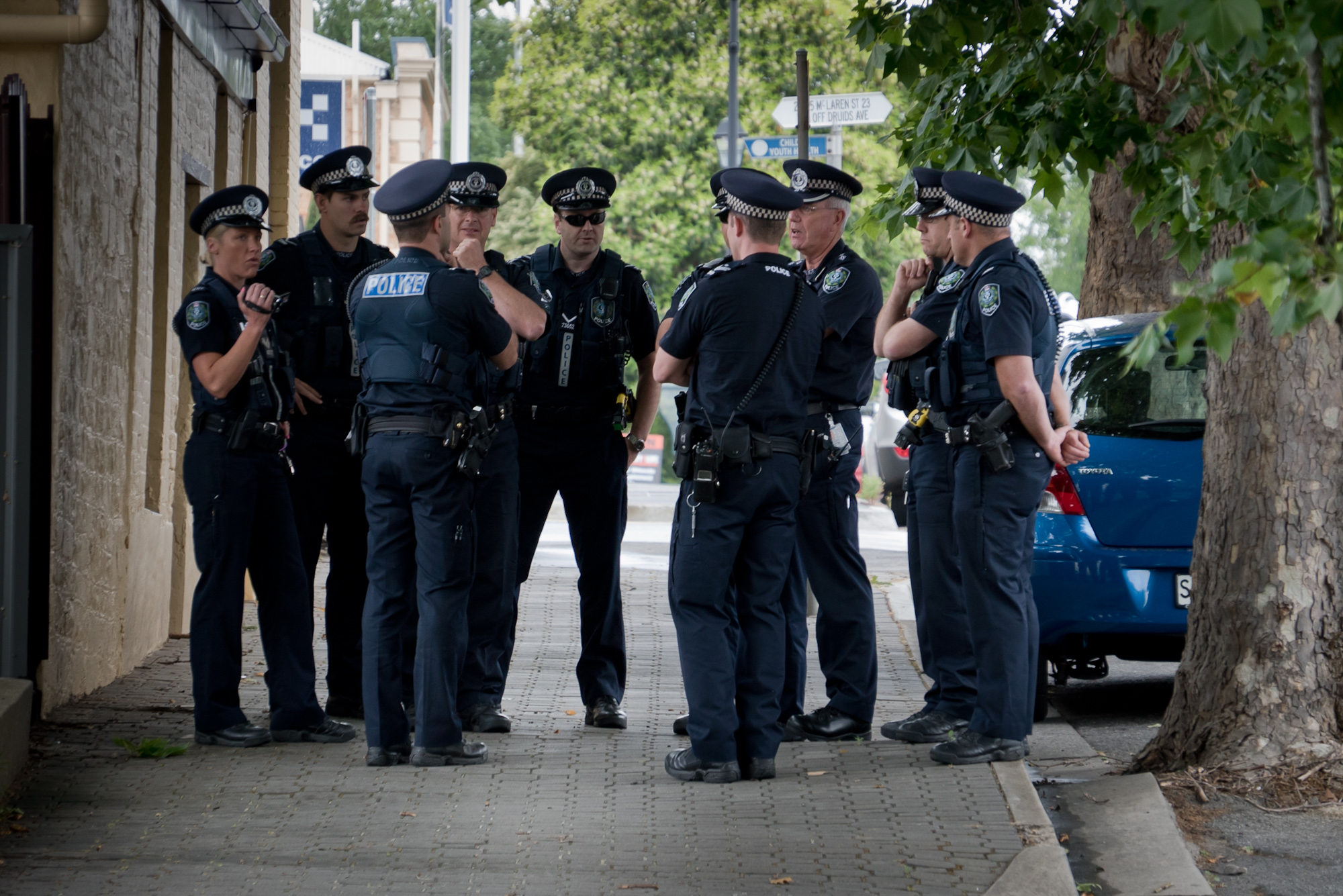
A group of SA police officers on scene

Constables and non-commissioned officers
Police Constable	Constable First Class	Senior; Constable	Senior Constable; First Class	Brevet; Sergeant	Sergeant	Senior; Sergeant	Senior Sergeant; First Class

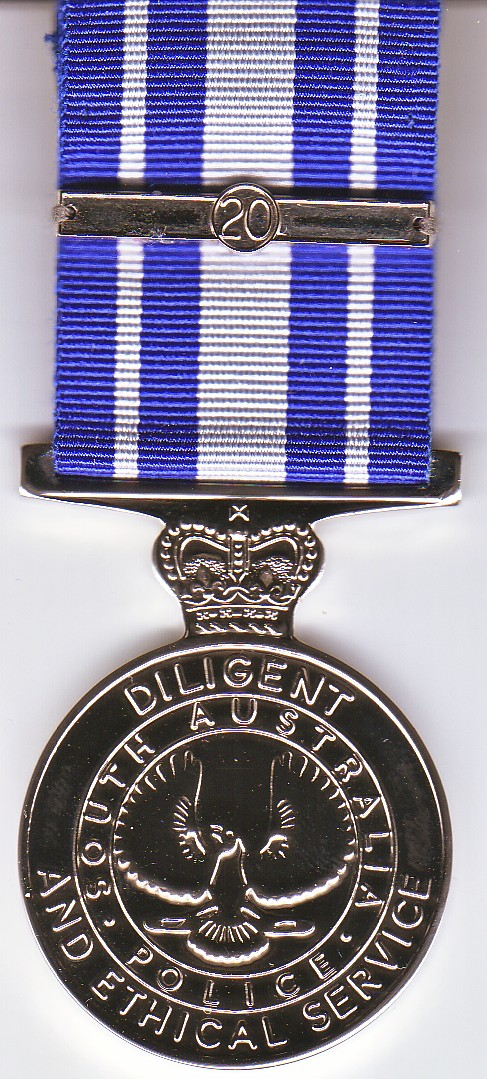
South Australia Police Medal

All grades of constable perform the same basic range of duties, with the rank only reflecting experience. The rank of probationary constable is held for the first fifteen months of service. A constable with one stripe is qualified for promotion to senior constable. A senior constable first class is either an officer qualified for promotion to sergeant/senior sergeant or has won a senior constable first class position on merit. A brevet sergeant is the second in charge of a team and it can be a temporary designation for an officer in a particular position which would require specialised skills, such as a detective.

A sergeant normally manages a team during a shift. A sergeant may also manage a small country station. A detective sergeant is normally in charge of a team in an investigations section. As with a sergeant, a detective sergeant may be the officer in charge of a country CIB unit.

A new rank was introduced by SAPol on 9 January 2025, that being a Sergeant First Class which can be attained by a Sergeant with no less than 5 years of permanent appointment at that rank and promotion to that rank is automatic. The rank insignia (not shown above) is 3 chevrons and a bar above them similar to the Senior Constable First Class and Senior Sergeant First Class ranks.

A senior sergeant is the officer in charge of a section, including traffic, criminal investigation, and operations (uniform), and traditionally does more administrative work than active patrol duties.

Officers of Police
Inspector	Chief; Inspector	Superintendent	Chief; Superintendent	Commander	Assistant; Commissioner	Deputy; Commissioner	Commissioner

Officers of Police were formerly known as commissioned officers. This name was changed as SAPOL officers no longer receive a Queen's Commission. Officers of Police act primarily as managers and generally do not partake in operational policing. An Inspector is in charge of a section. A detective inspector is normally in charge of the whole station CIB. A uniform inspector is normally in charge of the station's operations.

A chief inspector commands a department at station level. A uniform chief inspector is in charge of all uniformed officers, regardless of their attachments to assigned areas (e.g. general duties, traffic duties etc.). Some country Regions have chief inspectors as the regional commander. A detective chief inspector is in charge of all CIB-related matters.

Superintendents may be the manager of a District, Region or Branch, such as the Major Crime Branch. A Regions commander is generally a superintendent. A chief superintendent may be the manager of a specialised area, such as a Service Coordination Branch.

Chief Superintendents are generally officers in charge of an Operation Coordination Branch and coordinates our service delivery to SAPOL and the community and report directly to an Assistant Commissioner or a non Sworn Executive Director responsible for Service within SAPol (i.e. Business Service, Crime Service, Governance & Capability Service, Information Systems and Technology Service, Metropolitan Service, Operations Service, Security and Emergency Management Service and State Operations Service).

The rank of Commander exists within SAPOL’s rank structure; however, no member currently holds this rank, and it is not being utilised for any position within SAPOL’s organisational requirements.

An assistant commissioner is the manager of a service, such as Northern Operations Service or Crime Service.

The Deputy Commissioner is the assistant to the Commissioner, who commands the SAPol organisation.

=== Police Security Officers ===
Police Security Officers (PSOs) (formerly Protective Security Officers) are armed security police officers originally employed by SAPOL to perform security functions at government properties, to provide security to protected persons (such as the Governor of South Australia) and to monitor metropolitan CCTV cameras. PSOs functions and duties have over time increased to include duties traditionally performed by sworn Police Officers. PSOs normally have limited powers and are limited to using those power in prescribed circumstances or locations, however, under current legislation passed in 2022, PSOs duties may be extended by the Commissioner of Police and they may be granted full police powers and immunities in the performance of those duties. PSOs were utilised in the states response to the COVID-19 pandemic. PSOs have their own rank structure.

PSO Ranks
Police security officer trainee	Police security officer	Senior Police security officer	Police security officer Sergeant

== Uniform and equipment ==
=== Uniforms ===
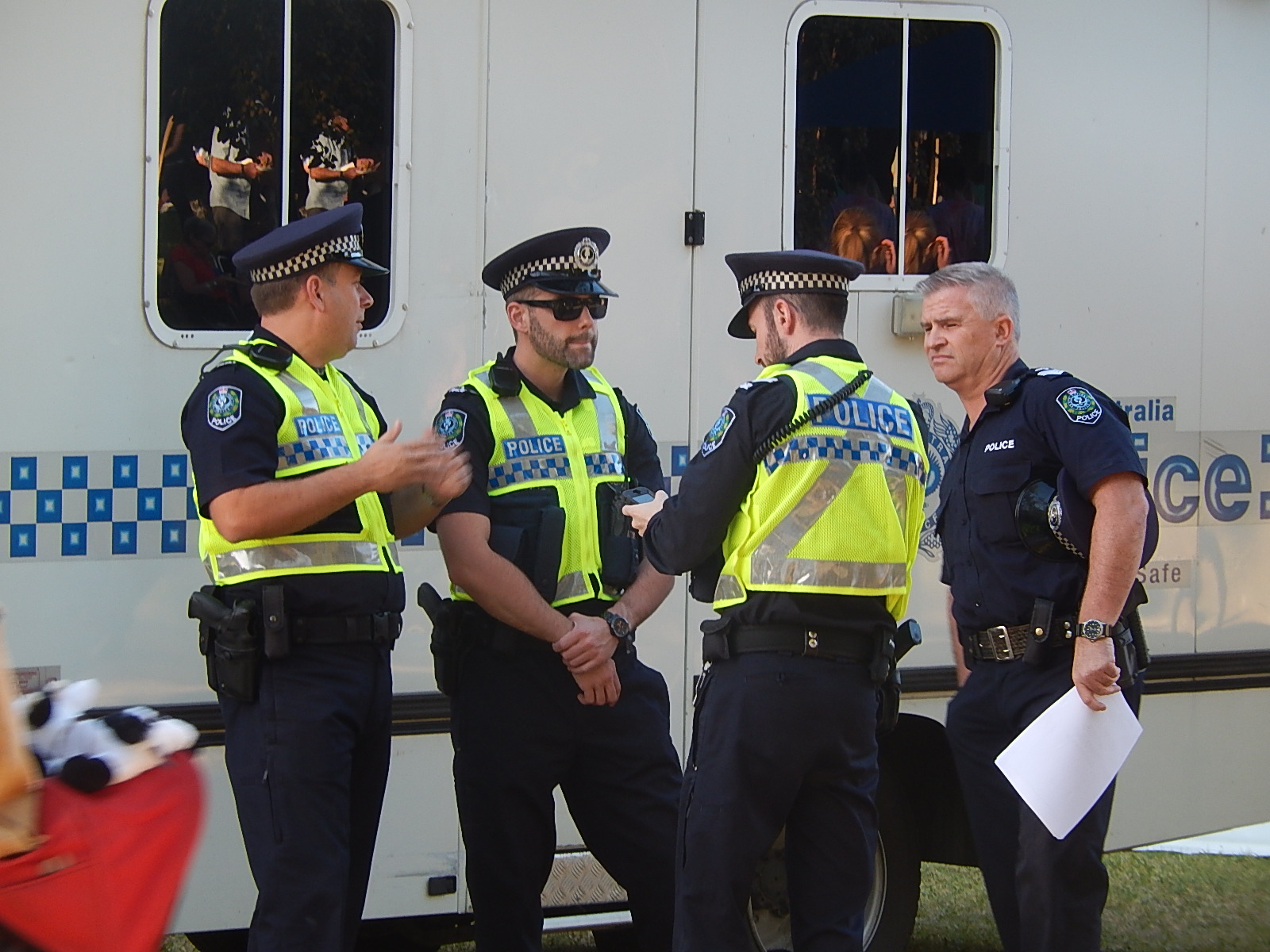
Police officers in the standard uniform of dark navy blue. Country staff still have the choice of wearing khaki pants

SAPOL issues uniforms to sworn police officers. Police officers working in non-specialised areas generally wear a standard uniform, which consists of a navy blue collared shirt with attached police badges and navy blue slacks. Short and long sleeve shirts are worn as preferred. Police officers can choose between either a dark blue peaked hat or an Akubra wide-brimmed hat and are not required to wear a tie. Baseball caps are worn in specialist areas, including STAR Group, Crime Scene, State Traffic Enforcement Section, and by Operational Safety Trainers. Officers in northern country areas wear khaki uniforms instead of blue. PSOs (Police Security Officers) wear slightly different shirts. The shirts and slacks are also navy blue, but they have golden markings and PSO markings. In the past, the shirt was white. This was changed at the end of 2019. Traffic camera section members wear a light blue uniform, similar to the older uniform previously worn by sworn members.

In 2010 SAPOL started consultations on a new darker uniform reminiscent of those worn by officers of the NYPD and LAPD. In 2012 SAPOL announced the new uniform would be introduced in mid-October 2012 and would be rolled out over 18 months. The only visible change from the consultation period was to the peaked cap. The white peak was changed to the same dark blue as the shirt and pants, which is called ink blue. SAPOL has implemented the use of stab-resistant vests for all patrol officers, PSOs and Police dogs.

=== Equipment and weaponry ===
Standard equipment issued to almost all officers are:

- Smith & Wesson M&P .40 S&W semi-automatic pistol
- Pepper spray
- ASP Extendable Baton
- Handcuffs
- Taser
- Light ballistic vest
- Bodycam

Criminal Investigation Officers are issued with the compact version of the semi-automatic pistol (M&Pc). Specialised units such as Special Tasks and Rescue (STAR Group) use other equipment suited to the nature of their duties. SA Police were among the last to carry revolvers as a duty weapon. They carried Smith & Wesson Model 66 (the stainless steel variant of the Model 19) revolvers in .357 Magnum until the switch to the Smith & Wesson M&P semi automatic in 2009. Legacy firearms are traded back to Smith & Wesson and resold to sporting goods distributors in USA.

Drones have been used for surveillance since June 2013.

In July 2020, a new rapid response armed unit the Security Response Section consisting of 48 officers who carry semi-automatic rifles became operational. The establishment of this unit was criticised for its lack of consultation, the broader militarisation of police, contributions to "police-industrial complex", and potential for harassment of marginalised groups such as homeless people, people from low-socioeconomic areas, and BIPOC communities.

== Transport ==
=== Vehicles ===
SAPOL officers use a number of vehicles in day-to-day duties. For much of its history SAPOL has used the Holden Commodore as its primary vehicle. Since the phasing out of the Holden Commodore (Last ZB Holden Commodore was officially decommissioned in August 2025) and now SAPOL relies upon the Kia Sorento and Toyota RAV4 as general duties vehicles.

The Volkswagen Tiguan has recently been introduced primarily for traffic related duties. SAPOL also uses vehicles including the Toyota Kluger, Mitsubishi Outlander and Toyota Camry. Also used are VW Transporter, Toyota Hilux, Holden Colorado, Isuzu D-MAX caged vehicles for prisoner transport and the 2-Door Ford Ranger with canopy for the Dog Operations Unit. In remote country areas, Toyota Land Cruisers and Troop Carriers are used as primary patrol vehicles. Patrol cars are used in both marked and unmarked variants, with the latter being a bit more extensive in its vehicle composition. SAPOL have also, in previous years, used high performance vehicles such as Holden's SS Commodore for traffic operations.

Members of the State Traffic Enforcement Section ride marked and unmarked Honda and BMW motorcycles for traffic, escort, and other duties.

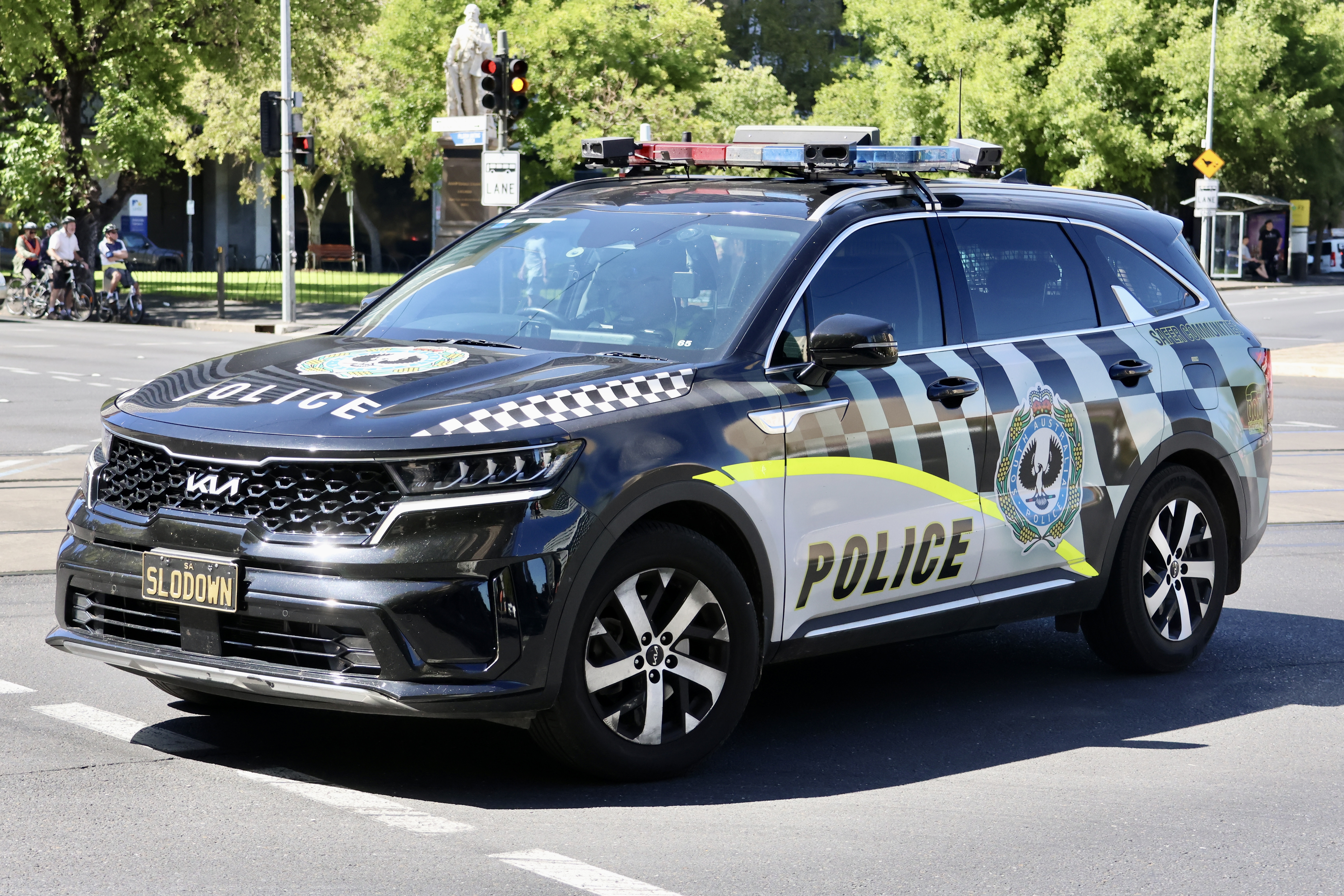
A state traffic services Kia Sorento

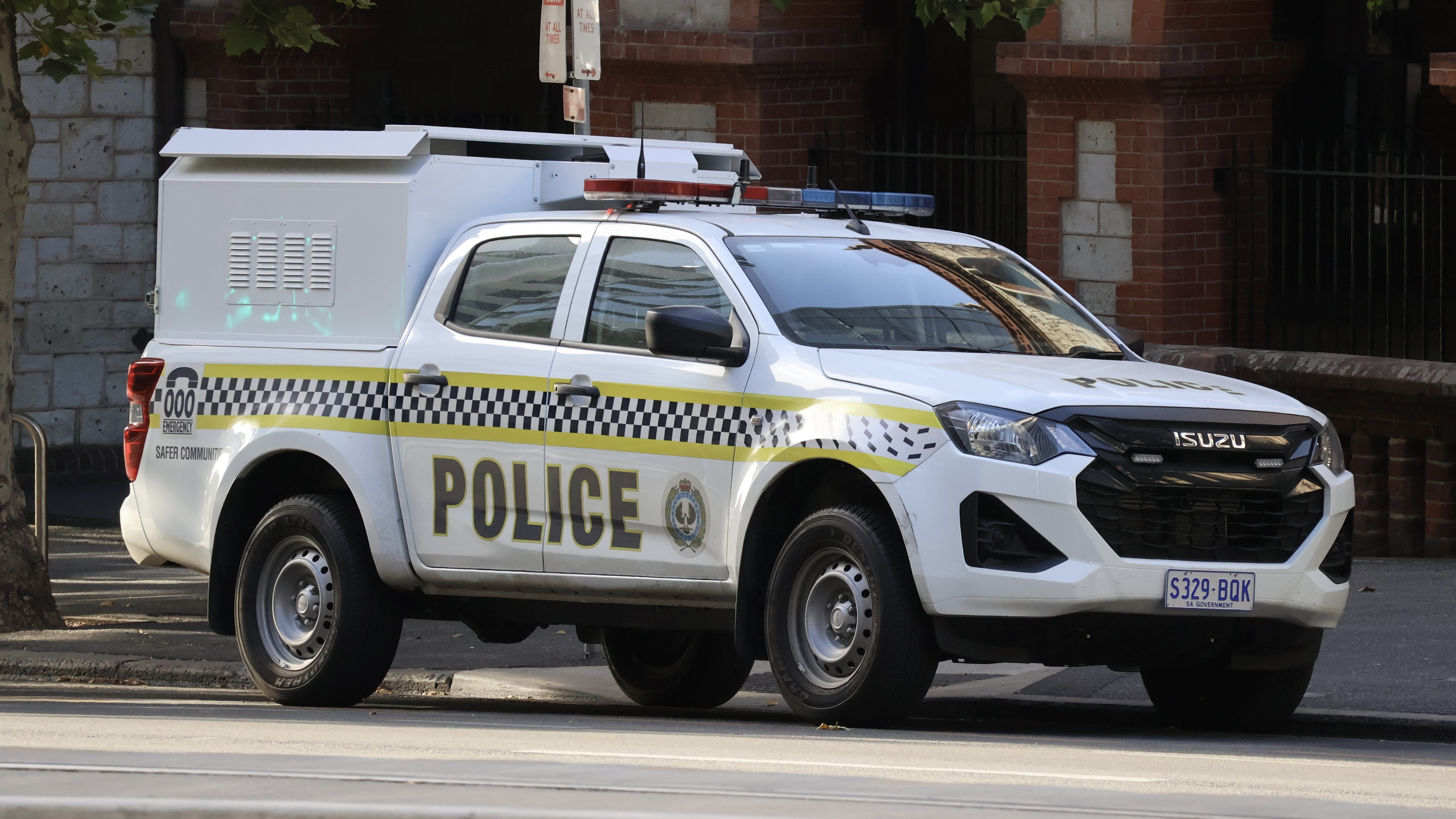
A prisoner transport Isuzu D-Max

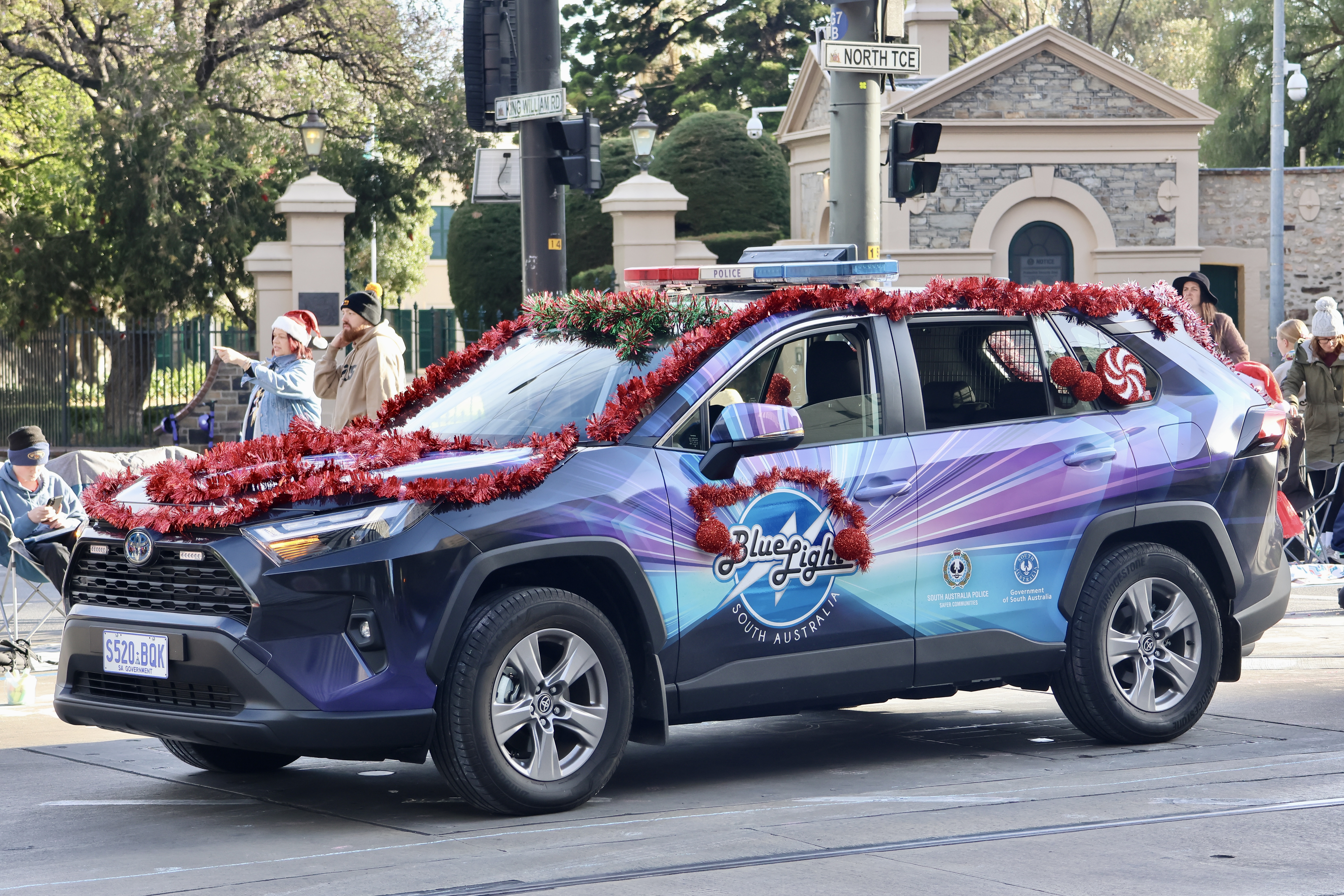
A general duties Toyota RAV4

=== Specialised vehicles ===
SAPOL utilise specialised Vehicles which are used in a wide variety of ways, for example, as a mobile police station/unit at a large public function, or as forward command posts at search and rescues, or other incidents such as siege or hostage situations. STAR Group also possess a Lenco BearCat armoured vehicle available for use in a siege or terrorist situations.

=== Watercraft ===
The SAPOL Water Operations Unit uses a number of watercraft including boats and Jet Skis to police coastal and inland waterways.

=== Mounted branch ===
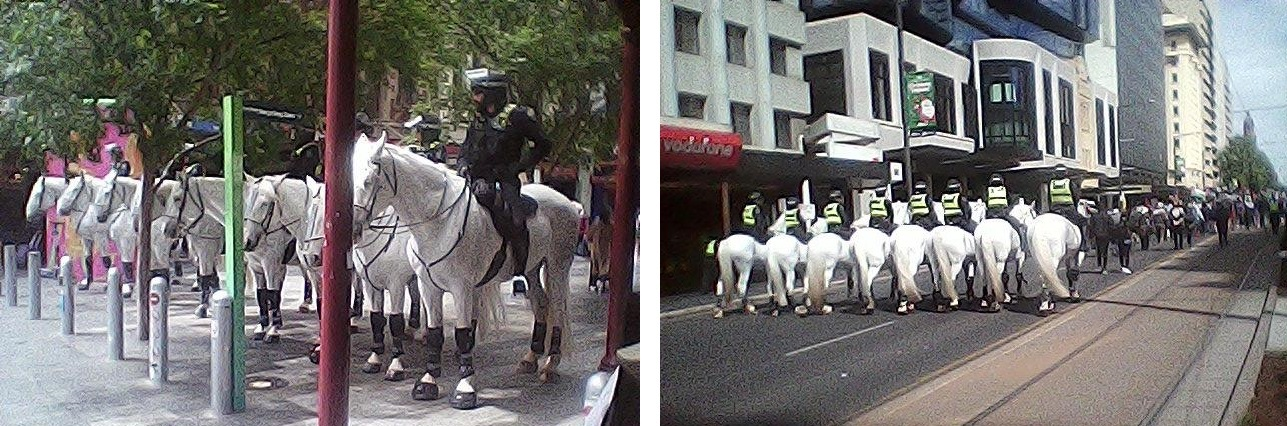

For ceremonial activities, crowd control and patrol duties, the SAPOL Mounted Operations Unit use grey horses. Until 2024, they were bred and trained at the Thebarton Police Barracks, in Park 27 of the Adelaide Park Lands, just northeast of the Adelaide city centre. These "police greys", as they are known, are ideal for police work as the light grey tones make the horse highly visible at night. They are also highly recognisable in the community and are often involved in community events such as leading the annual Credit Union Christmas Pageant and ANZAC Day parade.

The Thebarton Police Barracks have now been demolished to make way for a new Women's and Children's Hospital and the 'police greys' relocated to a purpose built facility in Gepps Cross.

=== Aircraft ===
Members of STAR Group and Transit Services Branch act as crew members on a modified Airbus Helicopters H145 Helicopter (callsign PolAir 53) which features an array of thermal and imaging sensors and is marked in a SAPOL livery. SAPOL also use a Pilatus PC-12 aircraft which is used to convey Police and prisoners across the state.

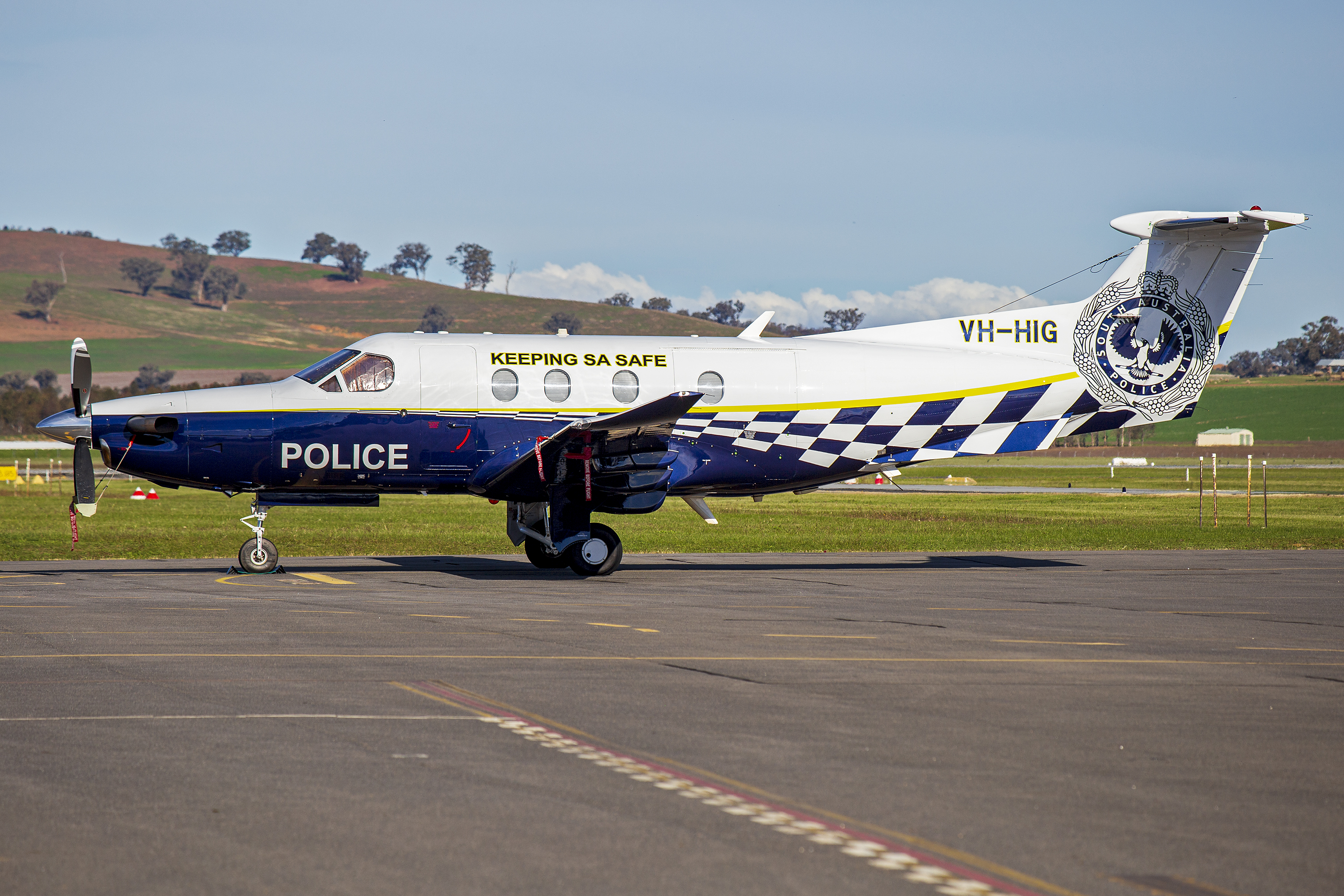
Pilatus PC-12/47E of South Australia Police

== Training and education ==
Recruit training is conducted at the SAPOL Police Academy located adjacent to the old barracks adjacent to Fort Largs in the north-western Adelaide suburb of Taperoo. Cadets undergo a 9 and a half month course, called the "Constable Development Program" (CDP). The CDP is broken down into five phases, which includes training at the Police Academy and field experience at metropolitan LSAs. Police cadets learn law, about investigations and police procedures. During recruit training, non-officers (police staff and volunteers) assist with various duties, such as cadet assessment, role playing and general administration. Cadets also undertake operational safety training, including self-defence and the use of firearms. Practical role-playing and assessments are part of the course.

=== Graduation and aftermath for new officers ===
Cadets graduate with the rank of probationary constable and are subject to a 15-month period of on-the-job training. Probationary Constables are required to work with a Field Tutor for the first 6 months of the probationary period whilst they complete a Personal Learning Portfolio. Probationary Constables also undertake a range of duties to enhance their learning, including traffic, prisoner management, and general duties. For the following 6 months, probationary constables continue to collect evidence of their workplace competency before attending the Probationary Constable Assessment Workshop to determine whether they are suitable to progress to the rank of constable. Upon completion of the probationary period, officers receive a Diploma of Policing, and are appointed to the rank of Constable.

Training is ongoing and further courses are available for officers to attend, should they wish to progress their policing career further.

SAPOL Protective Security Officers also undergo training at this location. The duration of this training course is only 12 weeks.

== Radio communications ==
SAPOL refers to the communications operation as "VKA". At 0400 hours (4am) on Tuesday 10 December 2002, SAPOL officially switched from standard 64 UHF channels to the SA Government Radio Network (SAGRN). This utilised digital encrypted radio transmissions, meaning that scanners could not listen to police communications.

SAPOL still have UHF licences and it is plausible they are available as back-up communication channels. SAPOL uses three primary devices for voice communication over the network. They are Spectra W7 mobile, XTS 5000 portable and Spectra W3 mobile. These can be controlled via the RCH3000 desktop controller, used in fixed locations generally by trained operators.

These devices have a number of features that are regularly used in patrols. These features include private call, page alert and telephone interconnect.

Private call allows units to directly talk to another unit without dispatch, or other users in the talkgroup, hearing. However, this comes with the inability for dispatch to contact either unit. Page function alerts another radio that someone else is attempting to contact them. Telephone interconnect enables units to make and answer calls through the system. However, only supervisors have the ability to make and answer to any number, general patrols are restricted to only a list of certified SAPOL numbers. Each LSA has two assigned 'talkgroups'.

COMCEN (Communications) have assigned talkgroup IDs, allowing them to pair an LSA's primary and secondary talkgroups together allowing control to manage two channels at once. The Secondary channel is often used for local/chat, dispatch lowers the volume of the secondary channel, which enables them to monitor the channels and talk to all units on duty in the LSA.

=== Call signs and unit designation identification system ===
SAPOL use location-based call signs. Units are called in by stating the station they come from followed by a designated number.

Examples:

- A unit in Elizabeth in the Northern District could be North 10.
- Higher-ranked officers have a different prefix. This is followed after the station name, and before the unit number:
  - Sergeant / Sergeant First Class = Vixen
  - Senior Sergeant = Mitre
  - Inspector/Chief inspector = Trojan
  - Superintendent/Chief superintendent = Baron
  - Example: North Mitre 10 is a Senior Sergeant at Elizabeth Police Station inside the Northern District with the unit number 10.

== Notable incidents ==
In 1988, Detective Chief Inspector Barry Moyse - formerly in charge of the drug squad - was himself convicted of trafficking heroin and other drugs that he had seized from dealers, and sentenced to 21 years imprisonment, of which he served ten years before being paroled. He died in 2010 at the age of 65.

In 1994, a bombing at the National Crime Authority Adelaide offices killed Western Australian Police Detective Sergeant Geoffrey Bowen and severely injured others. The bomb was concealed in a parcel that was addressed to Bowen. Domenic Perre, who had been identified as a person of interest shortly after the bombing and a known crime figure was convicted of the bombing in 2022.

During the 2016 South Australian blackout, SAPOL Commissioner Grant Stevens declared a major incident under the Emergency Management Act 2004. During the incident, police officers who were not responding to distress calls were ordered to undertake traffic control duties in the stormy conditions due to all traffic lights around the state becoming inoperable.

On 16 November 2023, Brevet Sergeant Jason Doig was shot and killed and another officer wounded on a rural property north of Bordertown, after responding with two other officers to a report of someone shooting a dog. Police returned fire, resulting in the perpetrator, a 26 year old male, receiving life-threatening gunshot wounds. The death of Jason took the number of SA officers killed in the line of duty to 62. Less than two months later, a female police officer died on duty at the Port Adelaide police station.

== List of commissioners ==
Rank	Name	Post-nominals	Term began	Term ended	Time in appointment	Notes
Inspector (Commander)	Henry Inman		28 April 1838	18 May 1840	2 years, 20 days	(Note: Position titled 'Officer in Charge of the South Australia Police Force'.)
Commissioner (Major)	Thomas Shuldham O'Halloran		8 June 1840	3 April 1843	2 years, 299 days	(Note: First to be titled 'Commissioner'. Resigned in order to serve as Police Magistrate.)
Commissioner	Boyle Travers Finniss		13 April 1843	12 May 1847	4 years, 29 days	(Note: Later the first Premier of South Australia.)
Commissioner	George Frederick Dashwood		12 May 1847	31 December 1851	4 years, 233 days	(Note: Member of Legislative Council)
Commissioner	Alexander Tolmer		28 January 1852	29 November 1853	1 year, 305 days	(Note: A veteran of the Portuguese Liberal Wars (1828–1834), Tolmer had been awarded by Queen Maria II of Portugal with the Knight of the Order of the Tower and Sword.)
Commissioner (Colonel)	Peter Warburton		29 November 1853	13 February 1867	13 years, 76 days	(Note: Dismissed from office.)
Commissioner	George Hamilton		13 February 1867	24 May 1882	15 years, 100 days	
Commissioner	William John Peterswald		3 May 1882	30 August 1896	14 years, 119 days	(Note: Died in office.)
Commissioner	Lewis George Madley	ISO, VD	9 September 1896	31 December 1909	13 years, 113 days	
Commissioner	William Henry Raymond		1 January 1910	30 June 1917	7 years, 180 days	
Commissioner	Thomas Edwards		30 June 1917	30 June 1920	3 years, 0 days	
Commissioner (Brigadier General)	Sir Raymond Leane	CB, CMG, DSO & Bar, MC, VD	1 July 1920	30 June 1944	23 years, 365 days	(Note: Crushed the Port Adelaide wharf strike of 1928. Knighted in 1945.)
Commissioner	William Francis Johns	CBE	1 July 1944	1 July 1950	6 years, 0 days	
Commissioner	Ivor Bren Green	LVO	1 July 1950	10 April 1957	6 years, 283 days	(Note: Died in office.)
Commissioner (Brigadier)	John McKinna	CMG, CBE, DSO, LVO, ED	1 July 1957	1 June 1972	14 years, 336 days	
Commissioner	Harold Salisbury	QPM	1 June 1972	17 January 1978	5 years, 230 days	(Note: Dismissed by Premier Don Dunstan for misleading parliament about the existence of the Special Branch and the information it had collected, particularly on Australian Labor Party politicians and the 'pink files' on known homosexuals.)
Commissioner	Laurence Draper	QPM	19 January 1978	27 May 1982	4 years, 128 days	
Commissioner	John Bryan Giles	AO, GM, BEM, QPM	27 May 1982	30 June 1983	1 year, 34 days	
Commissioner	David Hunt	AO, QPM	30 June 1983	31 December 1996	13 years, 184 days	
Commissioner	Malcolm Hyde	AO, APM	10 February 1997	20 July 2012	15 years, 161 days	
Commissioner	Gary Burns	BM, APM	20 July 2012	20 July 2015	3 years, 0 days	
Commissioner	Grant Stevens	APM	21 July 2015	Incumbent	11 years, 118 days	

== See also ==
- South Australia Police Historical Society
- Law enforcement in Australia
