= Commons club =

American collegiate organization

Commons Clubs
- NFCC, AACC or ACC
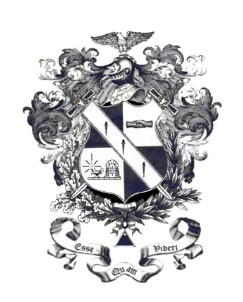
- Founded: October 8, 1833; 192 years ago Wesleyan University, Middletown, Connecticut
- Type: Social
- Affiliation: Independent
- Status: Active
- Scope: Regional, United States
- Motto: Quisque ceteris; Deus omnibus' "Of all things certain, God is over all" Labor et Fraternitas "Service and Brotherhood" Esse Quam Videri "To be, Rather than to Seem"
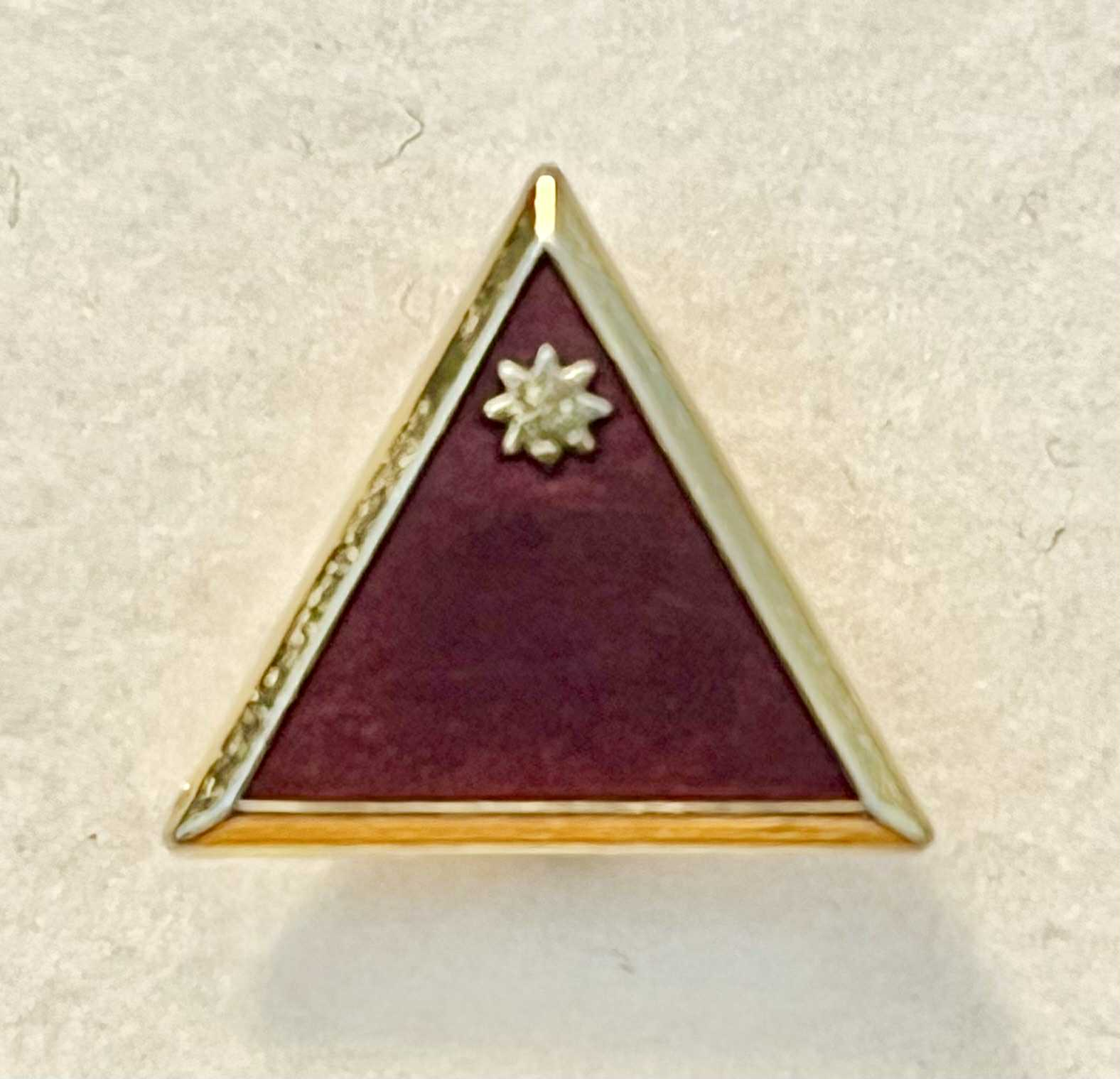
- Member badge: ACC Active Badge

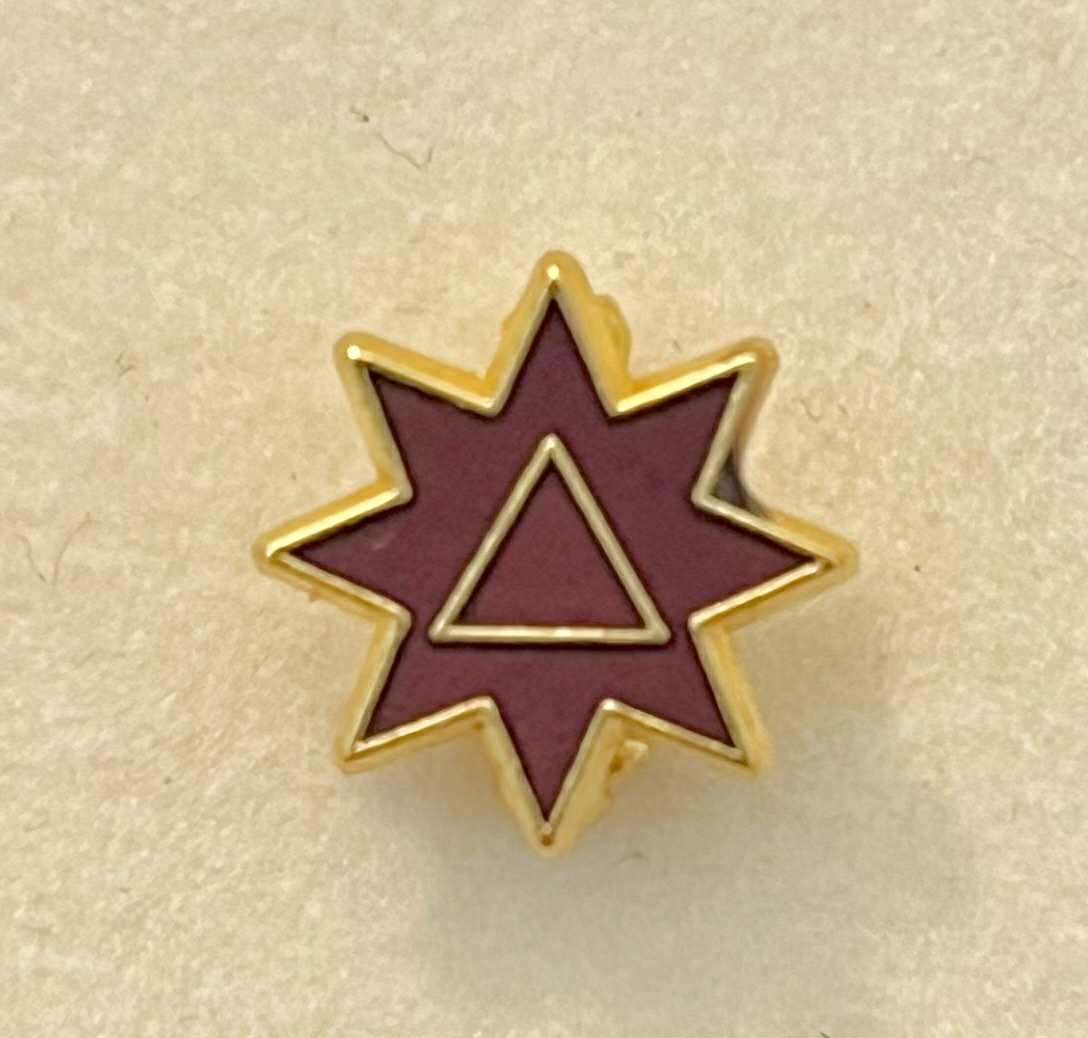
- Pledge pin: ACC Associate Pin
- Colors: Primary Colors Sanguine, Stone Purple, and Gold. Secondary Colors Green and White
- Symbol: Triangle, Star, and Torches
- Flower: Heirloom Moss Rose, rosa x centifolia and Michaelmas Daisy, aster amellus.
- Tree: White Oak, quercus alba
- Mascot: Eagle
- Patron Greek deity: Astræa
- Patron saint: Abraham Lincoln
- Publication: Commons Club Chronicle; American Commoner; The Common Journey
- Philanthropy: United Way
- Chapters: 3 active, 106 inactive
- Members: ~25,000 lifetime
- Nickname: Commoners
- Headquarters: United States, Canada
- Website: www.commonsclub.org

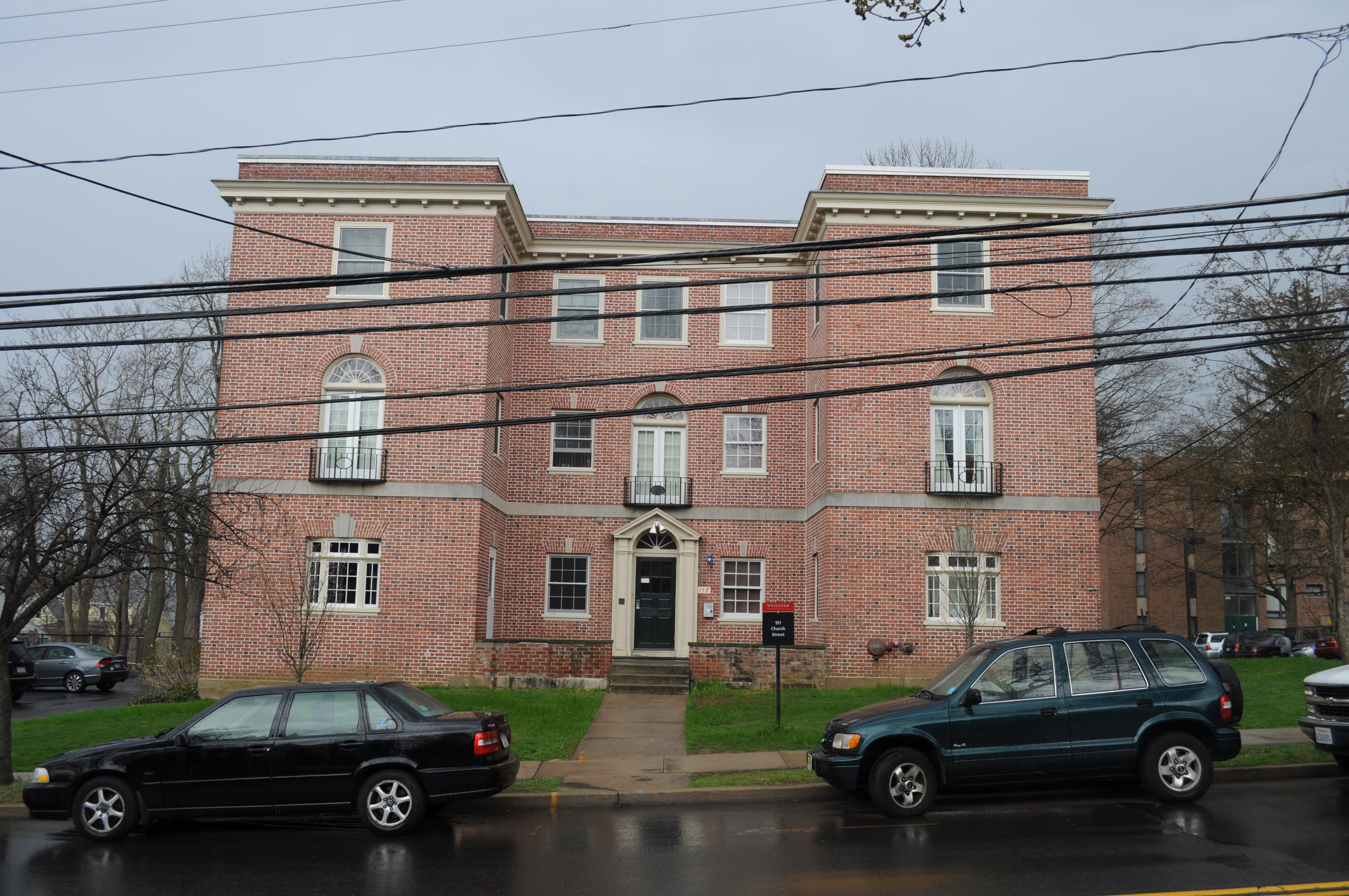
The former Commons Club building at Wesleyan University.

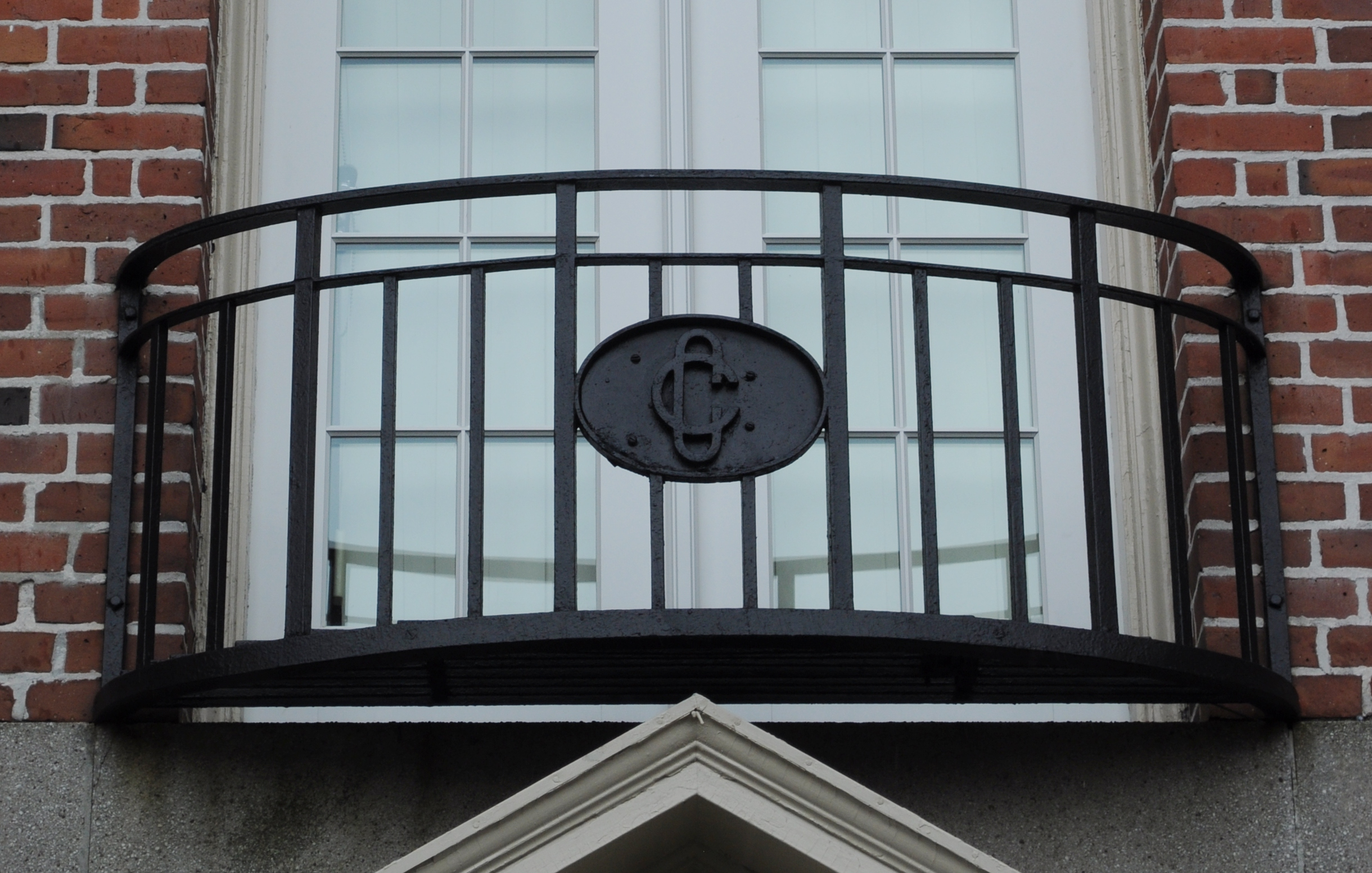
The linked "CC" logo is still visible in the iron railing of the small balcony at the center of the façade.

A Commons Club is a type of social organization whose membership is "open" rather than selective based on personal introduction and invitation. It may also refer to the lodge or other meeting facility associated with such a club and used for its activities. Usually, Commons Club refers to a type of men's social organization which flourished at institutions of higher education in North America in the late 19th and early 20th centuries.

== Principles ==
Commons Clubs both emulated and differentiated themselves from fraternities and other competing social institutions. They provided a social network, but membership was usually open to anyone interested in joining. The resources of a large organization could be put to sponsoring events and activities, as well as providing dining and housing, beyond the means of an individual student. Commons Clubs over time came to identify their chief ideals as Democracy, Service, and Brotherhood.

== History ==
Greek-letter literary and philosophical societies, starting with Phi Beta Kappa (est. 1779), rose at American universities as an outlet for students frustrated with the traditional curriculum centered on the classics. Some early organizations to use the phrase "commons club" were of this type, their name referring to the democracy and debates of the British House of Commons. In the mid-19th century, general or "social" fraternities supplanted the literary fraternities, to the point where "independent" students became disadvantaged in campus awards and activities as opposed to "Greeks" and considered to occupy a lower position in the social hierarchy of the time.

Four Commons Clubs federated in 1906, with clubs at Wesleyan University, Dartmouth College, Middlebury College, and Norwich University, and began the equivalent of a national organization that any of the college fraternities would have, and from this initial point, the federated organization began to grow.

The Wesleyan Commons Club was the oldest, founded in 1899. Wesleyan President Bradford Paul Raymond met with a group of non-fraternity students, to discuss the possibility of all non-fraternity students rooming and boarding together in a Wesleyan-owned building. Together, they would constitute a 'college commons'. This new organization was announced in the official Wesleyan University Bulletin of June 1899 : "Two conferences have been held recently by President Raymond with students interested in the formation of a commons, under the direction of College authorities. At each meeting the details of the proposed scheme were discussed at some length, and at the close of the second session the President announced that he had received pledges of membership from a sufficient number of men now in college to justify him in proceeding with the arrangement for establishing the commons next year."

The next academic year, still in 1899, sixteen non-fraternity men, led by Frederick Clark, Thomas Travis, and Herbert Ward, formally established the Wesleyan Commons Club. The university also organized the Commons Club as a boarding club, beginning with thirty-eight members, setting the price of board at $2.25 a week. The next fall, the membership increased to seventy and the college enlarged the building in which they were dining to provide meeting rooms for the group. Because of the financial aid provided, the university felt free to make a condition that all undergraduate members of the college, not belonging to fraternities, should be offered an election to the group regardless of race, color or creed.

== National Federation of Commons Clubs ==
The success of the Wesleyan Commons Club inspired the founding of similar organizations at Dartmouth College, Middlebury College, and Norwich University. These four formed the National Federation of Commons Clubs in 1906, which would add thirteen additional members by 1918 as well as numerous non-aligned Commons Clubs on campuses throughout the United States and Canada. Along with the increase in chapter memberships, went a great many improvements, following the easiest course in imitation of the older Greek-letter societies which were close at hand in every college, rather than in sticking to original principles or in making novel but difficult improvements. The Commons Clubs adopted, one after the other, most of the characteristics of the Greek-letter fraternities, not, however, without a fight at every adoption by the sterner, more democratic element in every chapter. The innovations consisted of yearly conventions, an annual magazine, initiation and installation rituals, robes, secret hand grips, badges, pennants, private fraternity houses, alumni organizations, and the like.

Because membership was open, a Commons Club could grow to a size unwieldy to govern, inadequate for forming close friendships, and unsuited to the effective advancement of their stated ideals. Factions and in some cases whole clubs split away and sought petitions from national fraternities or declared themselves a local fraternity. In 1905, ten members of the Middlebury Commons Club, including President George E. Kimball, left to form the Kappa Delta Rho national fraternity. The weak organization of the Federation itself left it vulnerable to splits along competing visions. The never-solved problems of the national order included that of financial support of an adequate system of national control and chapter assistance, without so raising the cost of membership as to defeat the democratic principles of the order; and that of maintaining an efficient and progressive national administration, while still fostering freedom of action of chapters and of individual members. Most of the national officials, by terms of the constitution, were unpaid undergraduates with little power and with scant financial allotment. National control was entirely lacking. Local autonomy allowed the chapters to develop without any spirit of national unity.

As the principles of the order became crystallized and some attempts were made to secure closer national control and similarity among the chapters, the old fight between the democratic and the progressive elements broke out in a more organized way. That is, the progressive elements in a number of chapters lined up against the democratic factions of other chapters and brought their arguments into the columns of the Chronicle and to the convention floor in 1916, 1917, and 1918.

An attempt was made by the national officers to postpone the 1918 annual convention in an effort to consolidate the interior position of the order, but the storm which had been hovering for years was far too advanced to stem. Ironically, the Wesleyan Commons Club hastened the storm by proposing in a 1917-round robin letter that the order use a Greek-letter name "Phi Mu Delta." The "progressives" insisted upon meeting and settling the question. Only a small representation attended the convention, delegates from seven of the remaining thirteen chapters. The progressives controlled the delegates of four chapters, the democrats of three. A compromise was tried but found unacceptable to either side. The progressives insisted upon a Greek-letter name and exclusive membership policies and the democrats leaned over backwards on the fundamental democratic principles of the order and insisted that the original wide open membership plan be strictly enforced and the old name retained.

The 1918 convention split into two separate meetings, Union College, University of Connecticut, University of Vermont, and University of New Hampshire delegates retiring. Clarence Dexter Pierce, a member of the University of Vermont Commons Club, successfully sponsored a resolution to declare the Federation a Greek-letter fraternity, with its attendant structure and selectivity. The Commons Clubs at the University of Vermont, University of New Hampshire, and University of Connecticut ratified the plan, forming what is now the Phi Mu Delta national fraternity. While the Union College Commons Club intended to join its counterparts in organizing Phi Mu Delta, the group instead elected to refound the Alpha Charge of Theta Delta Chi in 1923 because of pressure from its alumni.

Those from Wesleyan, Tufts, and Massachusetts, remaining, revised the Commons Club constitution, providing for compulsory adherence to the wide-open membership policies of the original Wesleyan Commons Club. The revised Commons Clubs secured the ratification of their stricter democratic constitution by the Hobart chapter and by the nominally existing but really war-casualty St. Lawrence chapter, and with the three convention stand-patters: Wesleyan, Tufts, and Massachusetts; carried on as the National Federation of Commons Clubs. By 1928 all the remaining chapters had withdrawn from the Federation and it died.

== American Association of Commons Clubs ==
While the National Federation of Commons Clubs, as such, passed into limbo because of the indifference of the members following World War I, the Commons Club movement is still present on many campuses of the United States. Due to the zealous extension activities of the Federation's members up to 1917, the Commons Club idea was spread widely.

The most important transplanting of this seed was in the formation of the American Association of Commons Clubs (AACC), while never actually a formal part of the federation, it is an historical descendant of it. The seed of the idea was carried to the campus of Denison University as early as 1914, during the extension campaign, and was harbored there. The resultant local Denison Commons Club was assisted by literature of the federation and by the Allegheny College chapter, at the time of its formation in 1916–17, and again in 1920 by the Federation officers, just prior to the completion of a movement at Denison University to organize a union of local Commons Clubs of the Midwest. Founded as a "non-fraternity" (but never anti-fraternity) organization, the Denison Commons Club sought to make available to all unaffiliated male students the advantages of fraternity life—which tended to be restricted to an exclusive segment of the campus. During the fall and winter of 1916, a group consisting of interested men met to develop an organization to provide social advantages to unaffiliated men. The President of Denison, C.W. Chamberlain, offered his support to the group. J. Thomas Allison was elected chairman, and those interested in forming an organization signed their names to a list. J. Leslie Putnam, J.T. Allison, and George B. Cressey were appointed to draw up a constitution.

The ideals for which the chapters strove were Democracy, Brotherhood, University First, Open Door, and non-Greek but not anti-Greek. Under these ideals, there were no membership restrictions based on race, creed or religion. All unaffiliated male students in good standing on campus were eligible for membership. The membership always included a wide variety of racial, national and religious—as well as social and economic—backgrounds. In line with the "Open Door" policy and the principles of democracy, no more than a 50 percent vote was required to elect a man to membership or qualified Pledges to Active status and entitled them to the ritual. The right to select members was thus recognized, but it was not carried to the extreme of a "blackball" system. Unlike most other fraternities, it took a majority vote to deny membership. The "Open Door" swung out as well as in, for a man could leave if he found that he did not fit in with the group or wished to join another fraternity, however, each officer took an oath not to exercise that right during his term of office. The Denison Commons Club strove to give as many men as possible the influence of fraternity life, and looked to what it could do for the man, not what he could do for the Commons Club. The Denison Commons Club was known for its inclusiveness from its very beginnings. Many of its members were minorities, biracial or otherwise disenfranchised members of society.

At a convention held in 1921 on April 22 and 23 in Granville, Ohio, delegates from the commons clubs of Denison University, Ohio University, and Hillsdale College met for the express purpose of forming a new national organization. The official delegates who gathered for this purpose were T.V. Caulkins Jr., and D.S. Cowles of the Denison Commons Club; Dennis West and W.V. Wilkerson of the Ohio University Commons Club; and Clinton Douglas and L.L. Latham of the Hillsdale College Commons Club. The Ohio Wesleyan group decided not to attend. The new organization was known official as the American Association of Commons Clubs. The new organization, commonly known as the American Commons Club, was an American letter fraternity for men without restrictions as to race, creed, or color. The American Association was augmented by a chapter at Wabash College, which was a remnant of a former Federation chapter there.

All chapters active prior to World War II succeeded in resuming operation after the war. The two in Colorado, however, were lost in 1948 and 1956. One new chapter was installed in 1949, but after a few years became weak and was asked for its charter in 1961. Many felt the Commons Club movement lost its relevance and withered in the more liberal climate of student life after World War II. With the withdrawal in 1963 of the Cincinnati Chapter, which had long been active in the Association, the remaining chapters at Denison and Adrian felt it futile to maintain a national organization with just two chapters. Accordingly, at a Special Convention held at Adrian April 4, 1964, the delegates voted unanimously to suspend national operation as of June 15. By 1964 only the founding chapter at Denison University remained, and in 1969 the American Association of Commons Clubs became an organization of only alumni while the active chapter became a member of Delta Chi national fraternity. At the time of the suspension of the Association, the national officers then current were designated as a permanent Executive Committee to act in the interests of the Association in all matters regarding protection and use of insignia, maintenance of records, disposition of assets, and other matters. These officers included the following: Allan M. Dewey (Denison '37), President; Edward G. Voss (Denison '50), General Secretary; R.A. Wiley (Adrian '50) Treasurer; and John N. Miller (Denison '54), Editor. A complete file of Association Convention proceedings, bulletins, handbooks, mimeographed documents, and publications, including The American Commoner, is deposited in the archives of the William Howard Doane Library at Denison.

== Association of Commons Clubs ==
In 1989, a new Commons Club was formed at Indiana University with the support of the alumni of the AACC. It spread to other Midwestern campuses and continues the Commons Club tradition.

== Women in the Commons Club movement ==
The Allegheny College Commons Club started in 1903 as the Teutonic Association, an all-male group that included in membership all non-fraternity men. At its 1909 annual banquet, the idea of adding women to the group resulted in the formation of Teutonia Association “…for the purpose of establishing a closer social relationship and opportunity among all non-sorority women of the college. The Wittenberg University Commons Club began as a group that admitted female students as equal members of the organization. When the members of DCC first heard of this, The Denison Commoner published the following reflection:

“There is also an organization containing both men and women at Wittenberg which claims to be patterned after the D.C.C. This is a dream, but, do you suppose that the Commons Club will have female chapters in the future? The men from Hillsdale ask if there is such a thing, stating that there is need of one at Hillsdale. Under a separate heading will appear an article telling of the formation of the Shepardson Club, doing the same thing for the women of Shepardson College that the D.C.C. does for the men of Granville College.” Before being admitted as a member of the AACC, the Wittenberg chapter decided to split the group into separate male and female organizations. It is not known what became of the female group. At Colorado State University, the AACC chapter helped to form the Valkyries Club for women that continued as a “sister” organization for the life of the chapter. At Denison, the Spring of 1920 saw the organization of the Shepardson Club, a “sister” organization to the Denison Commons Club. The women of Shepardson College that merged with Denison University at the turn of the century formed the Shepardson Club with the help of the AACC chapter at Denison. “The idea of the Shepardson Club was conceived in the minds of some freshmen. Other have seen the need, but realizing the enormity of an undertaking to remedy the situation, have gone no farther. It remained for those freshman girls to have the initiative and courage to act upon their convictions. When plans had been formulated, the good will of the sororities assured, and the approval and backing of the faculty and administration obtained, the Shepardson Club was launched. Unaffilliated upper-classmen and all freshmen were given an opportunity to join and there was an almost universal response…. The primal purpose of the organization is one of service…. Membership will not, however, prevent a girl from leaving at any time to accept a sorority bid. Through this Club there is now made possible equal social opportunities for all.” The Shepardson Club continued to share participation in many collegiate events over the years with the Denison Chapter. Eventually, it suffered from the same issues as the Denison Commons Club and ceased operations. At Ohio University, the local Commons Club attempted to copy Denison in the Spring of 1920 and form a girl’s Commons Club.

Named after the first AACC newsletter, Trianon was another “sister” organization to the Commons Club. It formed from the mergers of three college clubs in Ohio and Indiana. First, at the University of Cincinnati, in 1925, Dean Josephine P. Simrall and a group of female students, inspired and encouraged by the Cincinnati Commons Club, created the Campus Club. Next, in November 1926, several women at Butler University formed a Campus Club on their campus. Then, in the spring of 1929, thirty-seven female students at Miami University formed the Miami Girl's Club. Members of the three clubs convened the first National Convention on December 28 and 29, 1929, to form Trianon. In 1957, Trianon dropped open membership. The Trianon Pledge Manual explained, "The definition of how a girl could become a candidate was changed from a written application to a girl being invited upon a favorable majority vote of active members." In 1959, the sorority's official magazine creased publication. The sorority was still active in the 1960s, but the last known national convention met in 1965 and by 1974, mention of Trianon's activities in Butler's yearbooks ceased.

== Chapters ==
Institution	Year Founded	Status
Wesleyan University	1832 (founded as Cynics or Tub Philosophers) (founded NFCC)	first announced existence to campus with "Processional" on October 8, 1833, changed name to Thecannies Society in 1839, changed name to Commons Club 1840, in "Boarding Hall" 1854, split to found Wyvern Eating Club that became Gamma Phi chapter of Delta Kappa Epsilon in 1865, split to found Alpha Chi Alpha in 1911 (that affiliated with Alpha Chi Rho, disaffiliated to found EQV in 1959, disbanded 1968) and Gamma Psi in 1915 (that attempted to affiliated with Lambda Chi Alpha in 1928,), remaining group affiliated with Sigma Chi in 1928 disaffiliated 1959 to resume Commons Club, some members joined Phi Nu Theta (now Eclectic Society) rest disbanded 1974.
Brown University	1900 (became NFCC chapter)	split to found Sigma Delta Kappa in 1908, split to found Sigma Phi Delta in 1908 (that affiliated with Lambda Chi Alpha in 1912)
Union	1901 (known as Pyramid Club) (became NFCC chapter)	split to found BIW Club in 1908 (affiliated with Theta Lambda Phi in 1911 then affiliated with Lambda Chi Alpha in 1915,), founded Phi Mu Delta in 1918, but alumni forced them back to local Pyramid Club, then affiliated with Theta Delta Chi in 1923 as the Alpha Charge
Dartmouth	1902 (founded NFCC)	disbanded 1908
Middlebury	1903 (founded NFCC)	split to found Kappa Delta Rho in 1905, split to found Alpha Sigma Psi in 1911 (affiliated with Alpha Sigma Phi in 1925), disbanded 1925
Norwich University	1903 (founded NFCC)	split to found Delta Kappa Psi in 1905 (that joined Sigma Phi Epsilon in 1908), split to found Phi Kappa Delta in 1910 (that disbanded 1949), split to found Delta Sigma Tau in 1920 (that disbanded in 1935), split to found Iota Pi Kappa in 1927 (that disbanded in 1938), remaining group disbanded 1929
Colgate	1904 (independent)	disbanded 1959
Dickinson	1904 (independent)	disbanded 1955
Indiana University	1904 (independent)(coed)	founded Indiana Club in 1905, founded Association of Commons Clubs in 1989, disbanded 2012
Amherst College	1906 (became NFCC chapter)	disbanded 1933
Tufts	1906 (became NFCC chapter)	founded Delta Sigma Pi in 1921 (that affiliated with Delta Phi Sigma in 1924, then affiliated with the small national Alpha Kappa Pi in 1933, then merged with Alpha Sigma Phi in 1946)
Randolph-Macon College	1908 (independent)	disbanded 1967
Williams	1909 (independent)	changed name to Garfield Club in 1928, disbanded 1952
Ohio State	1910 (independent)	disbanded 1960
North Dakota State	1910 (independent)	disbanded 2004
Syracuse	1911 (became NFCC chapter)	affiliated with Lambda Chi Alpha in 1918
Colby	1912 (known as Omicron Theta)(became NFCC chapter)	affiliated with Lambda Chi Alpha in 1918
Massachusetts State College	1912 (known as Kappa Epsilon)(became NFCC chapter)	founded Kappa Epsilon fraternity in 1921, Kappa Epsilon survived until at least 1935, unknown what became of KE
Miami University	1912 (independent) (coed)	(founded Miami Girls Club, became Trianon (sorority) 1929, disbanded 1940), disbanded 1931
West VirginiaVirginia became NFCC chapter)	disbanded 1925	
Wabash	1912 (known as Barb Club)(became NFCC & AACC chapter)	split affiliated with Lambda Chi Alpha in 1918, disbanded 1932
DePauw University	1912 (became AACC chapter)	split to join Phi Beta Fraternity in 1915 (that became Delta Sigma Phi in 1920, joined Alpha Tau Omega 1924,), remaining members disbanded 1955
Connecticut State College	1912 (became NFCC chapter)	founded Phi Mu Delta in 1918
New Hampshire University	1913 (used name Delta Kappa) (became NFCC chapter)	founded Phi Mu Delta in 1918
University of Washington, Seattle	1913 (became NFCC chapter)	affiliated with Lambda Chi Alpha in 1918
Vermont	1913 (became NFCC chapter)	founded Phi Mu Delta in 1918
Hobart	1913 (became NFCC chapter)	founded Crescent Club in 1921 (planted colonies at Syracuse University, Columbia University and Lafayette College. The Lafayette College colony changed name to Krescent Fraternity in 1923 and helped found Alpha Phi Omega in 1925), changed name to Lambda Pi in 1925, joined Kappa Sigma in 1935.
Allegheny	1914 (coed)(known as Teutonic & Teutonia Associations)(became NFCC chapter)	Teutonic disbanded 1917 after rejection by Lambda Chi Alpha for charter, Teutonia changed name to Tallagewe in 1918, then founded Sigma Tau Sigma, then merged with Alpha Gamma Delta in 1921.
Carnegie	1914 (known as Delta Sigma Rho & Kappa Sigma Rho)(became NFCC chapter)	affiliated with Lambda Chi Alpha in 1929
Case Western Reserve University	1914 (known as Sketlioi Society)(became NFCC chapter)	affiliated with Lambda Chi Alpha in 1918
St. Lawrence	1916 (became NFCC chapter)	founded Delta Tau Phi in 1921, affiliated with Sigma Pi in 1930
Whitman College	1916 (independent)	disbanded 1932
Denison University	1917 (became AACC chapter in 1921)	affiliated with Delta Chi in 1969. New interest group formed in Fall 2017.
Ohio University	1919 (became AACC chapter in 1921)	founded Gamma Sigma in 1921, affiliated with Theta Chi in May 1925
University of Rochester	1920 (became AACC chapter)	disbanded 1926
Hillsdale College	1920 (became AACC chapter in 1921)	became Beta Alpha Delta in 1924, merged with Sigma Delta Rho in 1935.
Ohio Wesleyan	1920 (independent)	split to found Kappa Delta Alpha in 1925 (that disbanded in 1932), remaining group disbanded 1930
Wittenberg College	1920 (coed)(became AACC chapter)	disbanded 1934, reformed, disbanded again 1955
Simpson College	1920 (became AACC chapter)	merged with the Iowa Beta chapter of Theta Kappa Nu in 1935, merged with Lambda Chi Alpha in 1939
Vanderbilt	1922 (independent)	disbanded 1923
Rensselaer	1922 (independent)	disbanded 1931
Louisville	1922 (independent)	disbanded 1923
Akron	1923 (became AACC chapter)	disbanded 1951
Bucknell College	1923 (became AACC chapter)	affiliated with Phi Lambda Theta in 1925, merged with Chi Phi in 1983
Knox College	1923 (became AACC chapter)	disbanded 1933
Des Moines College	1924 (independent)	disbanded 1926
Ohio Northern	1924 (independent)	disbanded 1929
Muskingum College	1924 (independent)	disbanded 1926
University of Cincinnati	1924 (coed with Campus Club for women formed in 1925) (became AACC chapter)	(The originally co-ed Campus Club became Trianon (sorority) 1929, which disbanded 1967), Meanwhile, the University of Cincinnati Commons chapter disaffiliated from the AACC in 1964, then merged into Tau Kappa Epsilon as the Lambda-Gamma chapter in 1967.
Iowa State University	1925 (became AACC chapter)	disbanded 1936
Colorado State University	1925 (coed with Valkyries Club for women)(became AACC chapter)	disbanded 1956
Bowling Green	1926 (independent)	disbanded 1931
Butler University	1926 (coed) (known as University Club)	became Trianon (sorority) 1929, disbanded 1974
Monmouth	1928 (independent)	became Delta Sigma Pi (local) 1936, disbanded 1940
Penn State	1929 (became AACC chapter)	disbanded 1938
Denver	1929 (independent)	disbanded 1931
DePaul University	1930 (coed) (known as Campus Club)	became Trianon (sorority) 1930, disbanded 1933)
Purdue	1930 (became AACC chapter, became Alpha Theta Tau Commons Club chapter in 1990)	disbanded 2000
University of Northern Colorado	1931 (became AACC chapter)	disbanded 1948
Minnesota	1931 (independent)	disbanded 1955
Trinity College	1931 (independent)	became Alpha Theta 1953, reorganized as Kappa Psi 1955, affiliated with Phi Kappa Psi 1956
Kentucky State	1932 (independent)	disbanded 1934
Oklahoma	1932 (independent)	disbanded 1935
Baldwin-Wallace	1932 (independent)	disbanded 1937
Ball State	1932 (became ACC chapter in 1992)	disbanded 2000
Adrian College	1934 (became AACC chapter in 1936)	affiliated with Theta Chi in 1964
Kent State	1948 (became AACC chapter)	disbanded 1961
Davidson	1955 (independent)	disbanded 1957
Purdue-Calumet	1989 (became ACC chapter)	disbanded 1995
Vincennes	1989 (became ACC chapter)	disbanded 1991
Eastern Michigan	1993 (became ACC chapter)	disbanded 2006
Michigan	1996 (became ACC chapter)	disbanded 2002
Indiana State	1998 (became ACC chapter)	disbanded 2002
IUPUI	2003 (became ACC chapter)	disbanded 2009

== Notable members ==
Name	Chapter	Notability	References
Harry Elmer Barnes	Syracuse	Historian and sociologist who helped to found "revisionism" school of history	
Sterling Allen Brown	Williams	Professor, folklorist, poet, and literary critic	
George Cressey	Denison	Geology professor and author of over ten volumes and 200 articles.	
Harry Augustus Garfield	Williams	President of Williams College and administrator of the Federal Fuel Administration during World War I	
Earl W. Kintner	DePauw	Chairman of Federal Trade Commission, Deputy US Commissioner to UN War Crimes Commission, and senior partner at Arent Fox	
Harry Wellington Laidler	Wesleyan	Reporter, editor, founder of League for Industrial Democracy, and President National Bureau of Economic Research	
Kenneth Scott Latourette	Denison	History professor and author	
Kirtley F. Mather	Denison	Geology Professor, helped Clarence Darrow prepare for questioning William Jennings Bryan during Scopes Monkey Trial.	
Eleanor Roosevelt	Denison	First Lady, Delegate to the United Nations, Chair UN Commission on Human Rights	
Gordon S. Seagrave	Denison	Surgeon who spent 44 years in Burma treating thousands of patients	
Len Supulski	Dickinson	Professional football player for Philadelphia Eagles	
Jim Toy	Denison	LGBT activist and educator	
William Wilson	Norwich	Author and co-founder of Alcoholics Anonymous; was known until his death simply as "Bill W."	
Woodrow Wilson	Wesleyan	United States President, professor, and New Jersey governor	
Edward Voss	Denison	Botanist and expert on taxonomic nomenclature	
