= List of Phi Mu Delta chapters =

Phi Mu Delta is an American fraternity founded on March 1, 1918, at the University of Connecticut, the University of New Hampshire, and the University of Vermont. The fraternity absorbed Delta Alpha Pi in 1935. In the following list, active chapters are indicated in bold and inactive chapters are in italics.

Chapter	Charter date and range	Institution	Location	District	Status	Ref.
Nu Alpha	1918–1947	University of Connecticut	Storrs, Connecticut	New England	Inactive	(Note: Chapter formed from the Commons Club, established in 1913.)
Nu Beta	1918–1981, 1996–2009; 201x ?–2023	University of New Hampshire	Durham, New Hampshire	New England	Inactive	(Note: Chapter formed from the Commons Club, established in 1914.)
**Nu Gamma**	1918–1936, 1957–1992, 2013	University of Vermont	Burlington, Vermont	New England	Active	
Gamma Alpha	1921–1948	Northwestern University	Evanston, Illinois	Great Plains	Inactive	(Note: Chapter formed from the Cocqua Club, established in 1920.)
Nu Delta	1922–1977	Massachusetts Institute of Technology	Cambridge, Massachusetts	New England	Inactive	(Note: Chapter formed from Adelphi Club, established in 1919. Continues as Nu Delta local fraternity)
Gamma Beta	1922–1933	University of Michigan	Ann Arbor, Michigan	Great Plains	Inactive	
Gamma Gamma	1922–1939	University of Illinois		Great Plains	Inactive	
Nu Epsilon	1923–1974	University of Maine	Orono, Maine	New England	Inactive	(Note: Chapter formed from Zeta Pi, established in 1921.)
Gamma Delta	1923–1927	University of Wisconsin–Madison	Madison, Wisconsin	Great Plains	Inactive	(Note: Chapter formed from Kappa Alpha Delta, established in 1921.)
**Mu Alpha**	1924–2005, 2009	Susquehanna University	Selinsgrove, Pennsylvania	Mid-Atlantic	Active	(Note: Chapter formed from Alpha Sigma Delta, established in 1914.)
Pi Alpha	1925–1934	University of California, Berkeley	Berkeley, California	Pacific	Inactive	(Note: Chapter formed from Mesacon Club, established in 1922.)
**Mu Beta**	1926–2011, 2014	Ohio Northern University	Ada, Ohio	Mid-Atlantic	Active	(Note: Chapter formed from Masonic Club, established in 1922.)
Mu Gamma	1926–1960	Ohio State University	Columbus, Ohio	Mid-Atlantic	Inactive	(Note: Chapter formed from the Southern Club, established in 1923. Later, it absorbed Delta Alpha Pi.)
Nu Zeta (First)	1927–1929	Boston University	Boston, Massachusetts	New England	Inactive	(Note: Chapter formed from Delta Chi Omega, established in 1920.)
Nu Eta	1929–1979	University of Rhode Island	Kingston, Rhode Island	New England	Inactive	(Note: Chapter formed from Delta Sigma Epsilon, established in 1923.)
**Nu Theta**	1929	Rensselaer Polytechnic Institute	Troy, New York	New England	Active	(Note: Chapter formed from Sigma Phi Delta, established in 1923.)
Mu Delta	1930–1978	Wittenberg University	Springfield, Ohio	Mid-Atlantic	Inactive	(Note: Chapter formed from Pi Theta Pi, established in 1928.)
Mu Epsilon	1930–1940, 1954–2017	Pennsylvania State University	University Park, Pennsylvania	Mid-Atlantic	Inactive	(Note: Chapter formed from Omega Delta Epsilon, established in 1923.)
Pi Beta	1931–1935	Oregon State University	Corvallis, Oregon	Pacific	Inactive	(Note: Chapter formed from Kappa Delta Sigma, established in 1917.)
Nu Iota	1934–1941	Tufts University	Medford, Massachusetts	New England	Inactive	(Note: Chapter formed from Sigma Tau Alpha, established in 1906.)
Nu Kappa	1935–1937	New York University	New York City, New York	New England	Inactive	(Note: Chapter formed from Delta Alpha Pi, established in 1923.)
Nu Zeta (Second)	1953–1979, 19xx ?–2002	University of Massachusetts Amherst	Amherst, Massachusetts	New England	Inactive	(Note: Chapter formed from Zeta Zeta Zeta, established in 1950.)
Gamma Epsilon	1964–1973	University of Minnesota Morris	Morris, Minnesota	Great Plains	Inactive	(Note: Chapter formed from Gamma Delta Rho, established in 1955.)
Nu Lambda	1966–1974	Trinity College	Hartford, Connecticut	New England	Inactive	(Note: Chapter formed from Q.E.D., established in 1960.)
Nu Xi	1967–1994, 201x ?–2023	University of Southern Maine	Gorham, Maine	New England	Inactive	(Note: Chapter formed from Alpha Lambda Beta, established in 1928.)
**Mu Zeta**	1969–2004, 2011	Lock Haven University of Pennsylvania	Lock Haven, Pennsylvania	Mid-Atlantic	Active	(Note: Chapter formed from Bald Eagle Club, established in 1968.)
Mu Eta	1970–1975	Kutztown University of Pennsylvania	Kutztown, Pennsylvania	Mid-Atlantic	Inactive	
Nu Omicron	1970–2016	Keene State College	Keene, New Hampshire	New England	Inactive	(Note: Chapter formed from Sigma Delta Chi, established in 1968.)
Gamma Psi	1971–1976	Tarkio College	Tarkio, Missouri	Great Plains	Inactive	
Mu Kappa	1972–1980	Slippery Rock University	Slippery Rock, Pennsylvania	Mid-Atlantic	Inactive	(Note: Chapter formed from Phi Kappa Tau, established in 1971.)
Mu Omega (First)	1974–1977	University of Toledo	Toledo, Ohio	Mid-Atlantic	Inactive	
Mu Pi	1985–2006	California University of Pennsylvania	California, Pennsylvania	Mid-Atlantic	Inactive	(Note: Chapter formed from Pi Triton, established in 1972.)
Mu Theta	1998–2024	Indiana University of Pennsylvania	Indiana, Pennsylvania	Mid-Atlantic	Inactive	
Mu Lambda	1998–2007	Mansfield University of Pennsylvania	Mansfield, Pennsylvania	Mid-Atlantic	Inactive	(Note: Chapter formed from Alpha Omega Beta.)
Mu Iota	1999–2008	Lycoming College	Williamsport, Pennsylvania	Mid-Atlantic	Inactive	
**Mu Xi**	2003	Pennsylvania College of Technology	Williamsport, Pennsylvania	Mid-Atlantic	Active	
Nu Pi	2007–2018	State University of New York at Plattsburgh	Plattsburgh, New York	New England	Inactive	
Mu Omicron	2007–2025	Frostburg State University	Frostburg, Maryland	Mid-Atlantic	Inactive	
Nu Theta Eta	2011–201x ?	New England College	Henniker, New Hampshire	New England	Inactive	
**Sigma Alpha**	2013	Longwood University	Farmville, Virginia	Southern	Active	
Sigma Beta		University of Alabama	Tuscaloosa, Alabama	Southern	Inactive	(Note: Did not charter.)
Mu Rho	2016–2023	Shawnee State University	Portsmouth, Ohio	Mid-Atlantic	Inactive	
**Mu Sigma**	October 22, 2016	Rutgers University–New Brunswick	New Brunswick, New Jersey	Mid-Atlantic	Active	
Mu Tau	2016–20xx ?	Rutgers University–Camden	Camden, New Jersey	Mid-Atlantic	Inactive	
Nu Rho		Rhode Island College	Providence, Rhode Island	New England	Inactive	(Note: Colony formed in 2015, but did not charter.)
**Mu Upsilon**	March 1, 2018	Robert Morris University	Moon Township, Pennsylvania	Mid-Atlantic	Active	
Mu Phi		Marywood University	Scranton, Pennsylvania	Mid-Atlantic	Inactive	(Note: Colony formed in 2017, but did not charter.)
Sigma Gamma		University of Lynchburg	Lynchburg, Virginia	Southern	Inactive	(Note: Colony formed in 2017, but did not charter.)
**Mu Chi**	November 9, 2025	Stevenson University	Baltimore County, Maryland	Mid-Atlantic	Active	(Note: Colony formed in 2018, chartered in 2025)
Mu Psi		Stockton University	Galloway Township, New Jersey	Mid-Atlantic	Inactive	(Note: Colony formed in 2021, but did not charter)
Mu Omega (Second)		Temple University	Philadelphia, Pennsylvania	Mid-Atlantic	Inactive	(Note: Colony formed in 2023 but did not charter.)
