= Carex reznicekii =

Scientific classification
- Kingdom: Plantae
- Clade: Tracheophytes
- Clade: Angiosperms
- Clade: Monocots
- Clade: Commelinids
- Order: Poales
- Family: Cyperaceae
- Genus: Carex
- Subgenus: Carex subg. Carex
- Section: Carex sect. Acrocystis
- Species: C. reznicekii

Binomial name
- Carex reznicekii Werier

Species of grass-like plant

Carex reznicekii, known as Reznicek's sedge, is a species of Carex native to North America. It is a perennial. Described initially from a New York population, this species was named in 2006 in honor of the botanist Anton Reznicek, a specialist in the genus Carex.

== Description ==
This species resembles Carex umbellata and Carex nigromarginata. C. reznicekii can be readily distinguished from C. umbellata by the absence of basal spikes observable on C. reznicekii. C. reznicekii most strongly resembles C. nigromarginata, but can be differentiated by several factors, including C. reznicekii's narrower leaves and more-or-less uniform culm lengths. C. reznicekii's species status and distribution was determined in part through the use of herbaria records, where many instances of C. reznicekii were erroneously identified as C. umbellata and C. nigromarginata.
