= Carex porrecta =

Scientific classification
- Kingdom: Plantae
- Clade: Tracheophytes
- Clade: Angiosperms
- Clade: Monocots
- Clade: Commelinids
- Order: Poales
- Family: Cyperaceae
- Genus: Carex
- Subgenus: Carex subg. Vigneastra
- Section: Carex sect. Polystachyae
- Species: C. porrecta

Binomial name
- Carex porrecta Reznicek & Camelb.

Species of grass-like plant

Carex porrecta is a plant species known from Costa Rica, Colombia, Venezuela and Ecuador. It is found in humid forests at elevations of 1,600–2,600 metres (5,200–8,500 ft).

The epithet porrecta refers to the prolonged, outcurved beak on the perigynia, a distinctive feature of the species. Carex porrecta is an herb spreading by means of underground rhizomes. Stems are triangular in cross-section, up to 125 cm tall. Leaves are mostly basal, up to 60 cm long. One stem can produce as many as 14 flowering panicles, some at the ends of the stems, others in the axils of the leaves. Flowers are grouped into spikes in the panicles, each spike with both pistillate (female) and staminate (male) flowers. Female flowers are surrounded by perigynia up to 6 mm long, each with a beak at the end up to 3 mm long. Achenes are triangular in cross section, up to 2.5 mm long, often with a distinctive indentation on each side.
