= Harry G. Woodbury Jr. =

US general and engineer (1916–1997)

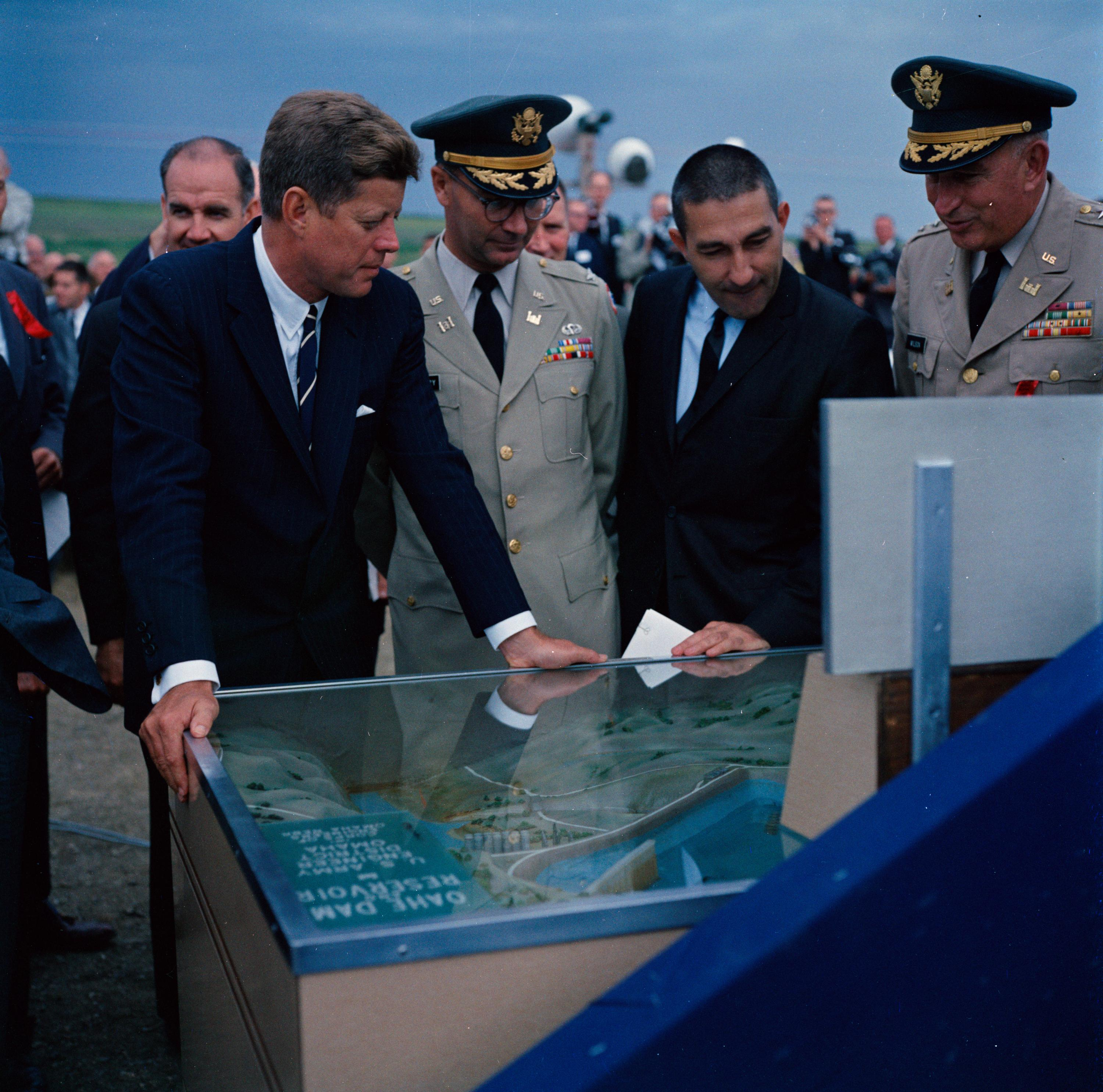
- Harry G. Woodbury Jr. (center, wearing glasses) with U.S. President John F. Kennedy (left) during the dedication ceremony of the Oahe Dam and Reservoir in 1962
- Born: 2 June 1916; Providence, Rhode Island
- Died: 24 March 1997 (aged 80); Fall River, Massachusetts
- Burial place: Francestown, New Hampshire
- Military career
- Branch: United States Army Corps of Engineers
- Service years: 1938–1968
- Rank: Brigadier General
- Commands: 871st Engineer Aviation Battalion
- Conflicts: Second World War; New Guinea campaign; Philippines campaign; Korean War
- Awards: Legion of Merit; Army Distinguished Service Medal (2); Silver Star; Commendation Ribbon

Harry George Woodbury Jr. (2 June 1916 – 24 March 1997) was a brigadier general in the United States Army who served in World War II and the Korean War. A graduate of Rhode Island State College, he was commissioned as a second lieutenant in the United States Army Corps of Engineers through the Army Reserve Officer Training Corps (ROTC) program. During World War II, he served in the Southwest Pacific Area, where he commanded the 871st Engineer Airborne Aviation Battalion.

== Early life ==
Harry George Woodbury Jr. was born in Providence, Rhode Island, on 2 June 1916, the son of Harry George Woodbury Sr. and his wife Ethel Field née Sanford. He attended East Providence High School, from which he graduated valedictorian in 1934. He then entered Rhode Island State College, where he was on the Varsity Debate Team and the chairman of the University Social Committee. He was a member and the president of the Phi Mu Delta fraternity and a member of the Phi Kappa Phi and Tau Beta Pi honor societies. He was also involved in the Army Reserve Officer Training Corps (ROTC) program, serving as the cadet colonel in his senior year. He graduated at the top of his class in 1938 and was commissioned as a second lieutenant in the United States Army Corps of Engineers.

Woodbury served in the Panama Canal Zone, where he was involved in the construction of roads and anti-aircraft artillery positions, and he was the assistant engineer responsible for construction of the Río Hato Army Air Base. In 1940, he married Pattie Phelps, the daughter of Colonel (later Brigadier General) Joseph V. Phelps, the commander of the 2nd Field Artillery, which was based in the Panama Canal Zone at the time. They had five children: two sons, Harry F. Woodbury and George A. Woodbury, and three daughters, Martha W. Cruciani, Barbara L. Woodbury and Carolyn E. Woodbury.

== World War II ==
During World War II, he served in the Southwest Pacific Area, where he commanded the 871st Engineer Airborne Aviation Battalion. Since it was an airborne unit, he qualified as a parachutist. Equipped with light bulldozers, graders, carry-alls, and mowers, his unit developed the forward airstrip at Tsili Tsili and supported the landing at Nadzab, where it landed on the undeveloped field in C-47 transports and turned it into an airbase. The 871st Engineer Airborne Aviation Battalion subsequently participated in the development of the forward airbase at Gusap. In the Philippines, the 871st Engineer Airborne Aviation Battalion, along with the 870th, built a new all-weather Floridablanca Airfield. For his service, he was awarded the Silver Star, the Legion of Merit, the Army Distinguished Service Medal and the Commendation Ribbon. When he was promoted to colonel at the age of 28, he became the youngest full colonel in the United States Army.

== Post-war ==
After the war, Woodbury earned a Master of Science degree in civil engineering from the Massachusetts Institute of Technology in 1947, co-writing a thesis on "Standing waves in supercritical flow of water", and once again graduating first in his class. This time his academic honors included membership of the Sigma Xi. Woodbury served as chief engineer of the US forces in Austria and Italy and on the staff of US Forces in Okinawa as the G-4 (logistics) officer. Returning to the United States, he was the District Engineer in Omaha, Nebraska, and chief engineer of the UN Forces in Korea, with the rank of brigadier general.

Woodbury's final assignment was as Director of Civil Works in the Office of the Chief of Engineers in Washington, DC in 1964. In this role he oversaw the Army Corps of Engineers' $1.3 billion (equivalent to $9 billion in 2024) construction program involving dams, dykes and power plants. He was also the engineer on the Atlantic-Pacific Interoceanic Canal Study Commission, which studied the possibility of a new canal between the Pacific and Atlantic Oceans. He received the Toulmin Award from the Society of American Military Engineers in 1967 for an article in The Military Engineer on the "Shipway between the Oceans". He retired from the Army in 1968 and was awarded an oak leaf cluster to his Army Distinguished Service Medal. That year he was awarded an honorary Doctor of Laws degree by the University of Rhode Island.

== Later life ==
In 1968, Woodbury joined the Consolidated Edison Company, as its Vice President of Construction, in Chappaqua, New York. He later moved to New York City when he became the company's Executive Vice President of Environmental Affairs. He retired in 1974 and moved to Little Compton, Rhode Island. From 1975 to 1986 he was a volunteer executive with the International Executive Service Corps, assisting with projects in Liberia, Chile, Nassau, Indonesia, Egypt and the Dominican Republic. Woodbury died in Little Compton on 24 March 1997 and was buried in his family plot in Francestown, New Hampshire, with full military honors in July 1997.
