= Delta Alpha Pi =

Delta Alpha Pi (ΔΑΠ) may refer to:

- Delta Alpha Pi (honor society), an honor society for those with disabilities
- Delta Alpha Pi (social), a social fraternity that merged with Phi Mu Delta
