= Trianon =

Trianon may refer to:

== Places ==
- Le Grand Trianon, a palace near Versailles, France
- Le Petit Trianon, a château near Versailles, France
- Le Trianon (theatre), a theatre and concert hall at 80, boulevard de Rochechouart in Paris
- Parque Trianon, a park in São Paulo, Brazil
- Petit Trianon, building housing the Academia Brasileira de Letras in Rio de Janeiro
- Trianon (Frankfurt am Main), a skyscraper in Germany
- The Trianon, formerly "Claremont", 1907 mansion now the main building of The Colorado Springs School
- Le Petit Trianon, a mansion on the grounds of De Anza College, California
- Trianon Ballrooms, ballrooms during America's big band era
- Trianon Historic District, a national historic district located at Kinston, North Carolina

== Arts ==
- Hotel Trianon, fictional hotel in Graham Greene's 1966 novel The Comedians
- "Trianon", the codename of the CIA spy in the 1984 Soviet film TASS Is Authorized to Declare...
- Live au Trianon, 2006 album by Camille Dalmais
- Trilogie au Trianon, alternate name for the 2001 Magma album, Theusz Hamtaahk

== People ==
- Catherine Trianon (1627–1681), French fortune teller and poisoner
- Henri Trianon (1811–1896), French critic, librettist and translator

== Other uses ==
- Treaty of Trianon, 1920 post-World War I treaty between Allies and Hungary, defining its borders
- Trianon model collection, a set of high-quality ship models ordered by Napoléon for documentary purposes
- Trianon, a trade name of sulfapyridine
- Trianon (sorority), a former American sorority
- Simca Trianon, a model of the French auto, Simca Vedette

Trianon is also the name of the concentration camp in the book “It Can’t Happen Here” by Sinclair Lewis
