= Landing at Nadzab =

WWII airborne landing of 1943

- Part of World War II, Pacific War
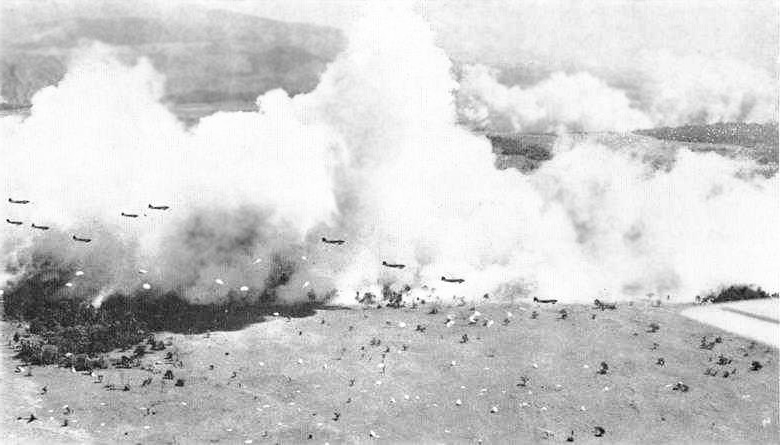
- 5 September 1943. Dwarfed by and silhouetted against clouds of smoke generated to provide concealment, C-47s from the US Army Air Forces drop a battalion of the 503rd Parachute Regiment at Nadzab, New Guinea. A battalion dropped minutes earlier is landing in the foreground.
Date	5 September 1943
Location	Nadzab, Morobe Province, Territory of New Guinea; 6°33′S 146°42′E
Result	Allied victory

Belligerents
United States; Australia	Japan

Commanders and leaders
(United States) Douglas MacArthur; (United States) George Kenney; (Australia) Thomas Blamey; (Australia) Edmund Herring; (Australia) George Alan Vasey	(Empire of Japan) Hitoshi Imamura; (Empire of Japan) Hatazō Adachi; (Empire of Japan) Kumaichi Teramoto; (Empire of Japan) Hidemitsu Nakano

Strength
6,000	2,000

Casualties and losses
119 killed; 241 wounded or injured; 166 evacuated sick	Unknown

The Landing at Nadzab was an airborne landing on 5 September 1943 during the New Guinea campaign of World War II in conjunction with the landing at Lae. The Nadzab action began with a parachute drop at Lae Nadzab Airport, combined with an overland force.

The parachute drop was carried out by the US Army's 503rd Parachute Infantry Regiment and elements of the Australian Army's 2/4th Field Regiment into Nadzab, New Guinea in the Markham Valley, observed by General Douglas MacArthur, circling overhead in a B-17. The Australian 2/2nd Pioneer Battalion, 2/6th Field Company, and B Company, Papuan Infantry Battalion reached Nadzab after an overland and river trek that same day and began preparing the airfield. The first transport aircraft landed the next morning, but bad weather delayed the Allied build up. Over the next days, the 25th Infantry Brigade of the Australian 7th Division gradually arrived. An air crash at Jackson's Field ultimately caused half the Allied casualties of the battle.

Once assembled at Nadzab, the 25th Infantry Brigade commenced its advance on Lae. On 11 September, it engaged the Japanese soldiers at Jensen's Plantation. After defeating them, it engaged and defeated a larger Japanese force at Heath's Plantation. During this skirmish, Private Richard Kelliher won the Victoria Cross, Australia's highest award for gallantry. Instead of fighting for Lae, the Japanese Army withdrew over the Saruwaged Range. This proved to be a gruelling test of endurance for the Japanese soldiers who had to struggle over the rugged mountains; in the end, the Japanese Army managed to withdraw its forces from Salamaua and Lae, though with extensive losses from exposure and starvation during the retreat. Troops of the 25th Infantry Brigade reached Lae shortly before those of the 9th Division that had been advancing on Lae from the opposite direction.

The development of Nadzab was delayed by the need to upgrade the Markham Valley Road. After strenuous efforts in the face of wet weather, the road was opened on 15 December 1943. Nadzab then became the major Allied air base in New Guinea.

== Background ==
=== Strategy ===
==== Allied ====
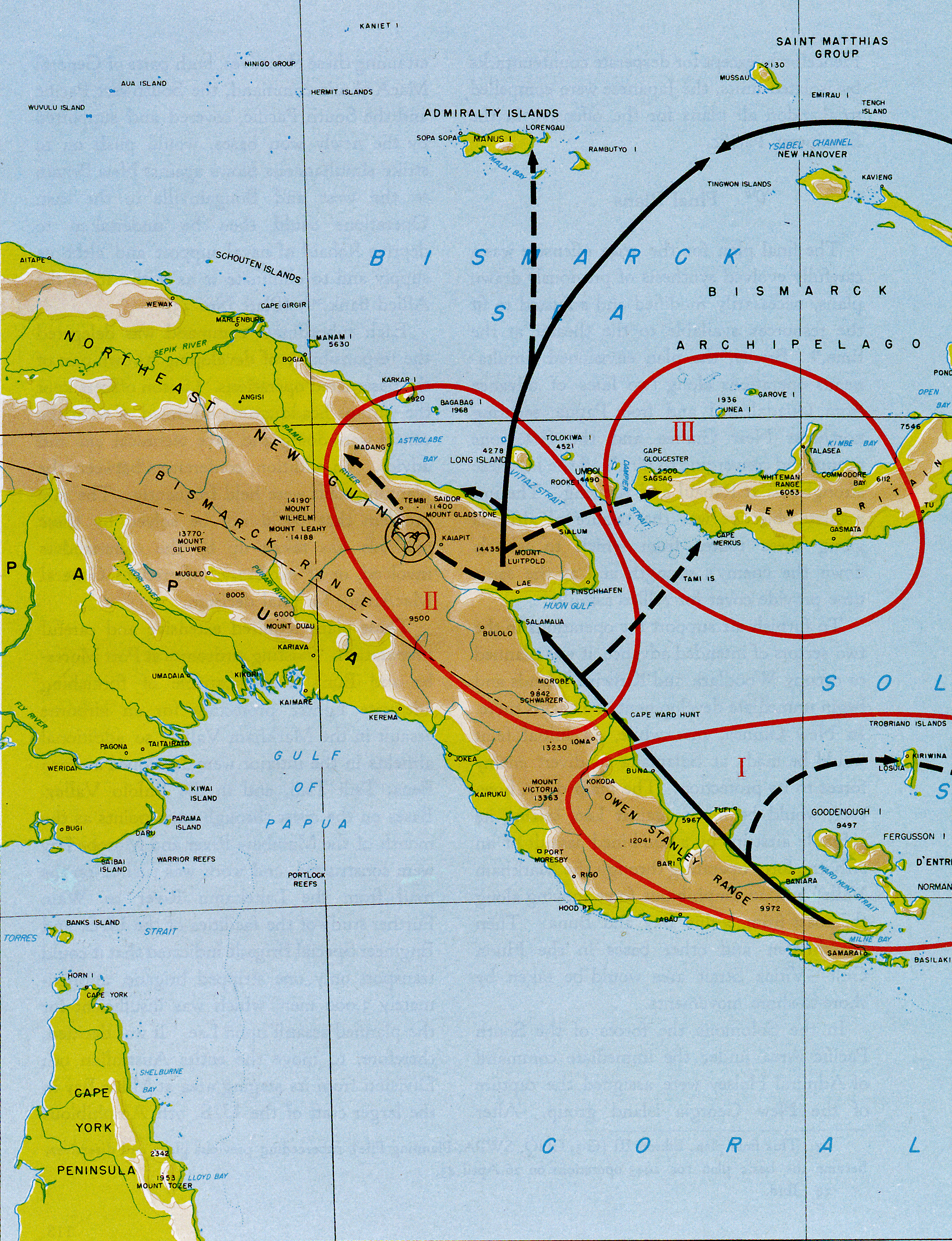
Elkton III Plan, March 1943

In July 1942, the United States Joint Chiefs of Staff approved a series of operations against the Japanese bastion at Rabaul, which blocked any Allied advance along the northern coast of New Guinea toward the Philippines or north toward the main Japanese naval base at Truk. In keeping with the overall Allied grand strategy of defeating Nazi Germany first, the immediate aim of these operations was not the defeat of Japan but merely the reduction of the threat posed by Japanese aircraft and warships based at Rabaul to air and sea communications between the United States and Australia.

By agreement among the Allied nations, in March 1942 the Pacific theatre was divided into two separate commands, each with its own commander-in-chief. The South West Pacific Area, which included Australia, Indonesia, and the Philippines came under General Douglas MacArthur as supreme commander. Most of the remainder, known as the Pacific Ocean Areas, came under Admiral Chester W. Nimitz. There was no overall commander, and no authority capable of resolving competing claims for resources, setting priorities, or shifting resources from one command to the other. Such decisions had to be made on the basis of compromise, cooperation and consensus.

Rabaul fell within MacArthur's area, but the initial operations in the southern Solomon Islands came under Nimitz. The Japanese reaction to Task One, the seizure of the southern part of the Solomon Islands, was more violent than anticipated and some months passed before the Guadalcanal Campaign was brought to a successful conclusion. Meanwhile, General MacArthur's forces fought off a series of Japanese offensives in Papua in the Kokoda Track campaign, Battle of Milne Bay, Battle of Buna–Gona, the Battle of Wau and the Battle of the Bismarck Sea.

Following these victories, the initiative in the South West Pacific passed to the Allies and General Douglas MacArthur pressed ahead with his plans for Task Two. At the Pacific Military Conference in Washington, D.C. in March 1943, the plans were reviewed by the Joint Chiefs of Staff. The chiefs were unable to supply all the requested resources, so the plans had to be scaled back, with the capture of Rabaul postponed to 1944. On 6 May 1943, MacArthur's General Headquarters (GHQ) in Brisbane issued Warning Instruction No. 2, officially informing subordinate commands of the plan, which divided the Task Two operations on the New Guinea axis into three parts:

1. Occupy Kiriwina and Woodlark Islands and establish air forces thereon.
2. Seize the Lae–Salamaua–Finschhafen–Madang area and establish air forces therein.
3. Occupy western New Britain, establishing air forces at Cape Gloucester, Arawe and Gasmata. Occupy or neutralise Talasea.

The second part was assigned to General Sir Thomas Blamey's New Guinea Force. As a result, "It became obvious that any military offensive in 1943 would have to be carried out mainly by the Australian Army, just as during the bitter campaigns of 1942."

==== Japanese ====
The Japanese maintained separate army and navy headquarters at Rabaul which cooperated with each other but were responsible to different higher authorities. Naval forces came under the Southeast Area Fleet, commanded by Vice Admiral Jinichi Kusaka. Army forces came under General Hitoshi Imamura's Eighth Area Army, consisting of the Seventeenth Army in the Solomon Islands, Lieutenant General Hatazō Adachi's Eighteenth Army in New Guinea, and the 6th Air Division, based at Rabaul. As a result of the Battle of the Bismarck Sea, the Japanese decided not to send any more convoys to Lae, but to land troops at Hansa Bay and Wewak and move them forward to Lae by barge or submarine. In the long run they hoped to complete a road over the Finisterre Range and thence to Lae through the Ramu and Markham Valleys.

Imamura ordered Adachi to capture the Allied bases at Wau, Bena Bena and Mount Hagen. To support these operations, Imperial General Headquarters transferred the 7th Air Division to New Guinea. On 27 July 1943, Lieutenant General Kumaichi Teramoto's Fourth Air Army was assigned to Imamura's command to control the 6th and 7th Air Divisions, the 14th Air Brigade and some miscellaneous squadrons. By June, Adachi had three divisions in New Guinea; the 41st Division at Wewak and the 20th Division around Madang, both recently arrived from Palau, and the 51st Division in the Salamaua area, a total of about 80,000 men. Of these only the 51st Division was in contact with the enemy. Like Blamey, Adachi faced formidable difficulties of transportation and supply just to bring his troops into battle.

=== Geography ===
The Markham River originates in the Finisterre Range and flows for 110 miles (180 km), emptying into the Huon Gulf near Lae. The Markham Valley, which rises to an elevation of 1,210 feet (370 m), runs between the Finisterre Range to the north and the Bismarck Range to the south and varies from 6 to 12 miles (10 to 19 km) wide. The valley floor is largely composed of gravel and is generally infertile. Half of its area was covered by dense kangaroo grass 4–5 feet (1.2–1.5 m) high, but in parts where there had been a build-up of silt, Kunai grass grew from 6 to 8 feet (1.8 to 2.5 m) high. Rainfall is around 39 inches (1,000 mm) per annum. The Markham Valley was traversable by motor vehicles in the dry season, which ran from December to April, and therefore formed part of a natural highway between the Japanese bases at Lae and Madang.

=== Planning and preparation ===
At Blamey's Advanced Allied Land Forces Headquarters (Adv LHQ) in St Lucia, Queensland, the Deputy Chief of the General Staff, Major General Frank Berryman, headed the planning process. A model of the Lae-Salamaua area was constructed in a secure room at St Lucia, the windows were boarded up and two guards were posted on the door round the clock. On 16 May, Blamey held a conference with Berryman and Lieutenant General Sir Edmund Herring, the commander of I Corps, around the model at which the details of the operation were discussed. Blamey's operational concept was for a double envelopment of Lae, using "two of the finest divisions on the Allied side". Major General George Wootten's 9th Division would land east of Lae in a shore-to-shore operation and advance on Lae. Meanwhile, Major General George Alan Vasey's 7th Division, in a reprise of the Battle of Buna–Gona in 1942, would advance on Lae from the west by an overland route. Its primary role was to prevent reinforcement of the Japanese garrison at Lae by establishing itself in a blocking position across the Markham Valley. Its secondary task was to assist the 9th Division in the capture of Lae. The plan was generally known as Operation POSTERN, although this was actually the GHQ code name for Lae itself.

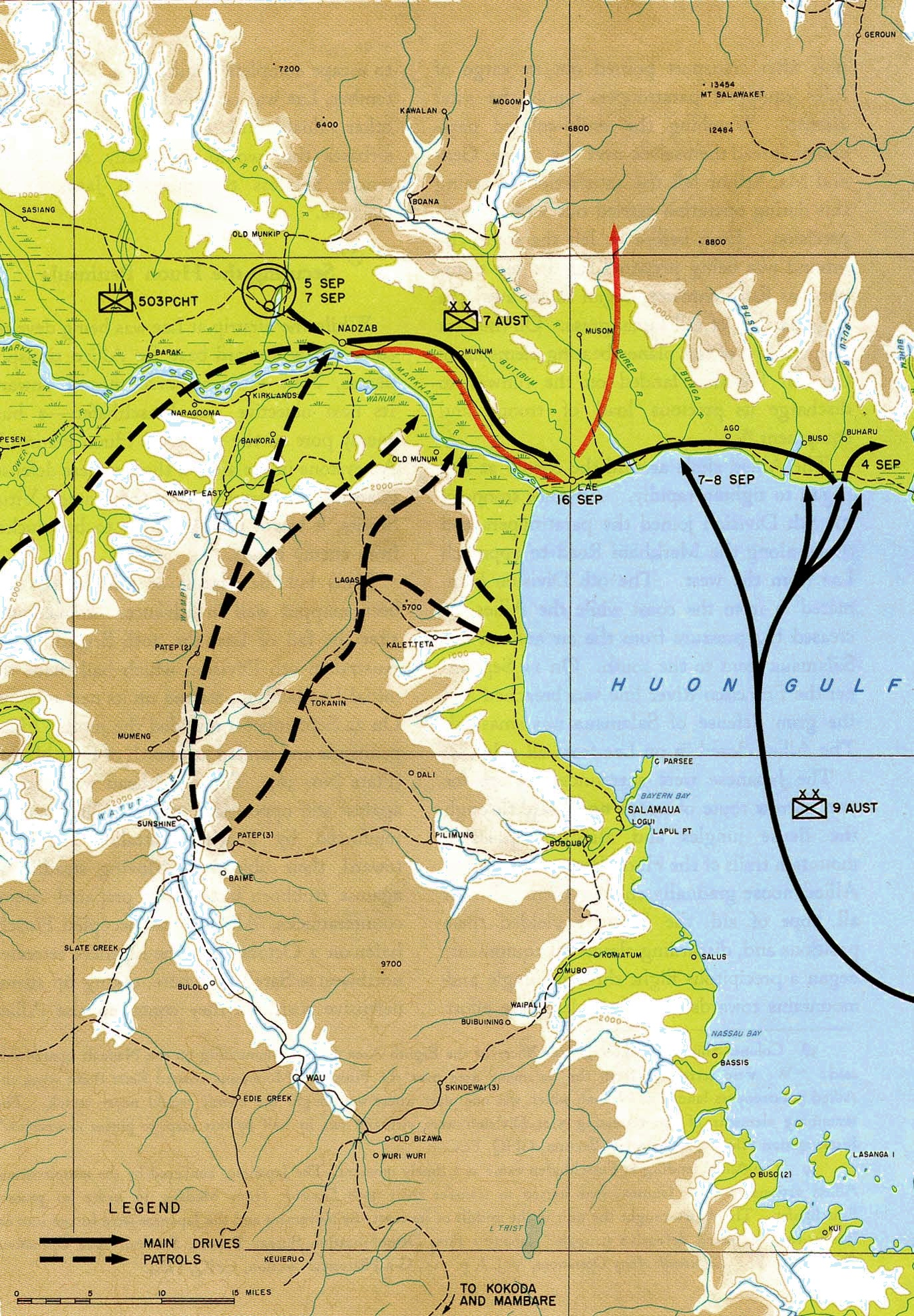
Lae-Nadzab operations

Meanwhile, Major General Stanley Savige's 3rd Division in the Wau area and Major General Horace Fuller's US 41st Infantry Division around Morobe were ordered to advance on Salamaua so as to threaten it and draw Japanese forces away from Lae. The result was the arduous Salamaua Campaign, which was fought between June and September, and which at times looked like succeeding all too well, capturing Salamaua and forcing the Japanese back to Lae, thereby throwing Blamey's whole strategy into disarray.

The POSTERN plan called for the 7th Division to move in transports to Port Moresby and in coastal shipping to the mouth of the Lakekamu River. It would travel up the river in barges to Bulldog, and in trucks over the Bulldog Road to Wau and Bulolo. From there it would march overland via the Watut and Wampit Valleys to the Markham River, cross the Markham River with the aid of paratroops, and secure an airfield site. There were a number of suitable airfield sites in the Markham Valley; Blamey selected Nadzab as the most promising.

Vasey pronounced the plan "a dog's breakfast". There were a number of serious problems. It relied on the Bulldog Road being completed, which it was not, due to the rugged nature of the country to be traversed and shortages of equipment. Even if it was, the 7th Division would have been unlikely to make the operation target date. It had taken heavy casualties in the Battle of Buna–Gona and was seriously under-strength, with many men on leave or suffering from malaria. It would take time to concentrate it at its camp at Ravenshoe, Queensland on the Atherton Tableland. To bring it up to strength, the 1st Motor Brigade was disbanded in July to provide reinforcements. Reinforcements passed through the Jungle Warfare Training Centre at Canungra, Queensland, where they spent a month training under conditions closely resembling those in New Guinea.

The delays in getting the overland supply route organised and the 7th Division itself ready meant that, in the initial stages of the operation at least, the 7th Division would have to be maintained by air. Vasey further proposed that the bulk of his forces avoid a tiring overland march by moving directly to Nadzab by air, which increased the importance of capturing Nadzab early. MacArthur agreed to make the 2nd Battalion, 503rd Parachute Infantry Regiment based at nearby Gordonvale, Queensland, available to New Guinea Force to capture Nadzab. He further authorised the regiment to conduct training with the 7th Division and a number of exercises were conducted. Colonel Kenneth H. Kinsler, the commander of the 503rd, eager to discuss the Battle of Crete with the 21st Infantry Brigade's Brigadier Ivan Dougherty, took the unusual step of parachuting into Ravenshoe. On 31 July, Vasey raised the prospect of utilising the entire regiment with Kinsler. Blamey took up the matter with MacArthur, who authorised it on 8 August. Blamey made the Australian Army transport MV Duntroon available to ship the regiment from Cairns to Port Moresby, except for the 2nd Battalion and advance party, which moved by air as originally planned.

The 7th Division was treated to a training film, "Loading the Douglas C-47", and the commander of the Advanced Echelon of Lieutenant General George Kenney's Fifth Air Force, Major General Ennis Whitehead, made five C-47 Dakota transports available to the 7th Division each day so they could practise loading and unloading. Whitehead also made a Boeing B-17 Flying Fortress available so Vasey could fly low over the target area on 7 August. Meanwhile, the 2/2nd Pioneer Battalion and 2/6th Field Company practiced crossing the Laloki River with folding boats. They flew to Tsili Tsili Airfield on 23 and 24 August.

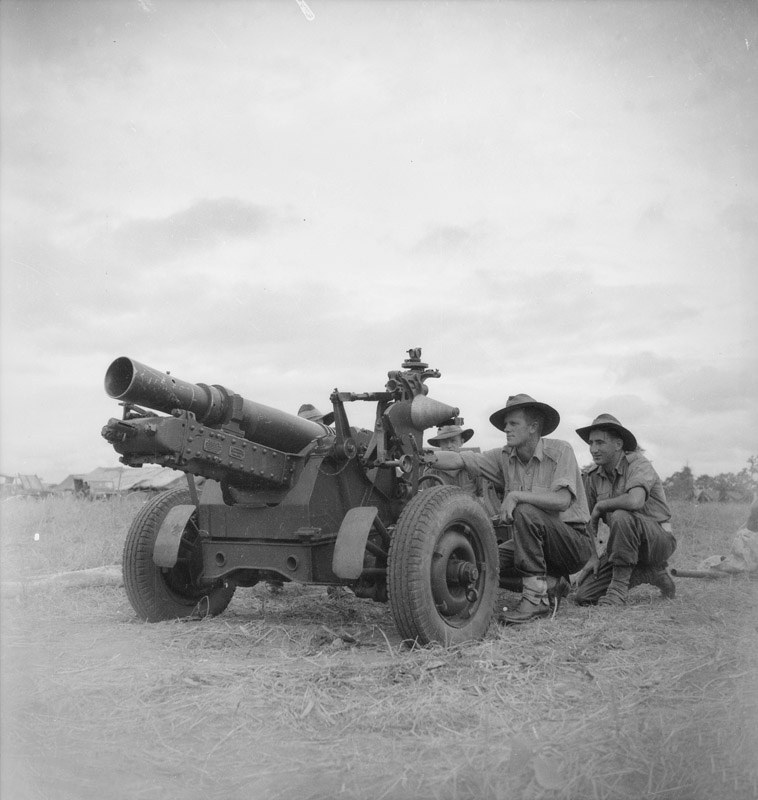
Crew of a short 25-pounder in the Markham Valley

To give the paratroops some artillery support, Lieutenant Colonel Alan Blyth of the 2/4th Field Regiment proposed dropping some of its eight short 25-pounders by parachute. A call went out for volunteers and four officers and 30 other ranks were selected. On 30 August, Vasey watched them carry out a practice jump at Rogers Airfield. This turned out to be the easy part. Brand new guns were received from the 10th Advanced Ordnance Depot at Port Moresby on 23 August. Two were handed over for training while, as a precaution, the remaining six were sent the 2/117th Field Workshops for inspection and checking. All six were condemned, owing to a number of serious defects in assembly and manufacture. On 30 August, the gunners received orders to move out the next day, so the 2/51st Light Aid Detachment cannibalised six guns to produce two working guns, which were proofed by firing 20 rounds per gun. Only one was ready in time to leave with the gunners so the other followed on a special flight. Eight of the 2/4th Field Regiment's Mark II 25-pounders were also condemned owing to the presence of filings in the buffer system. Vasey was less than impressed.

Vasey was concerned about the Japanese strength in the Lae area, which his staff estimated at 6,400, in addition to the 7,000 that Herring's I Corps staff estimated were in the Salamaua area. However, a more immediate danger was posed by the Japanese Fourth Air Army at Wewak. Photographs taken by Allied reconnaissance planes showed 199 Japanese aircraft on the four fields there on 13 August. On 17 August, Whitehead's heavy and medium bombers and fighters, escorted by fighters, bombed Wewak. Taking the Japanese by surprise, they destroyed around 100 Japanese aircraft on the ground. In September, the Japanese Army air forces had at their disposal only 60 or 70 operational aircraft to oppose the Allied air forces in New Guinea, although both the 6th and 7th Air Divisions were in the area.

On the south bank of the Markham River lay Markham Point, where the Japanese maintained a force of about 200 men on commanding ground. Part of the 24th Infantry Battalion was ordered to capture the position. The attack on the morning of 4 September went wrong from the start, with two scouts being wounded by a land mine. The force fought its way into the Japanese position but took heavy casualties and was forced to withdraw. Twelve Australians were killed and six were wounded in the attack. It was then decided to merely contain the Japanese force at Markham Point, which was subjected to mortar fire and an airstrike.

== Battle ==
=== Assault ===
Transport aircraft were controlled by the 54th Troop Carrier Wing, which was commanded by Colonel Paul H. Prentiss, with his headquarters at Port Moresby. He had two groups under his command: the 374th Troop Carrier Group at Ward's Field and the 375th Troop Carrier Group at Dobodura, plus the 65th and 66th Troop Carrier Squadrons of the 403rd Troop Carrier Group at Jackson's Field. In addition, Prentiss could draw on the 317th Troop Carrier Group at Archerfield Airport and RAAF Base Townsville, although it was not under his command. Postponing the operation from August to September 1943 allowed for the arrival of the 433rd Troop Carrier Group from the United States. Each squadron was equipped with 13 C-47 aircraft, and each group consisted of four squadrons, for a total of 52 aircraft per group.

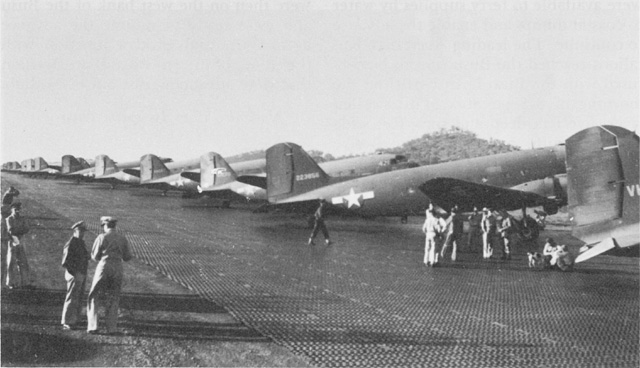
C-47 transport planes loaded with paratroops for the drop at Nadzab. The two men at left are Generals Kenney and MacArthur.

The actual date was chosen by General Kenney based on the advice of his two weather-forecasting teams, one Australian and one American. Ideally, Z-Day would be clear from Port Moresby to Nadzab but foggy over New Britain, thereby preventing the Japanese air forces at Rabaul from intervening. Forecasting the weather days in advance with such precision was difficult enough in peacetime, but more so in wartime, when many of the areas from which the weather patterns developed were occupied by the enemy and data from them was consequently denied to the forecasters. When the two teams differed over the best possible date, Kenney "split the difference between the two forecasts and told General MacArthur we would be ready to go on the morning of the 4th for the amphibious movement of the 9th Division to Hopoi Beach and about nine o'clock on the morning of the 5th we would be ready to fly the 503rd Parachute Regiment to Nadzab."

Z-Day, 5 September 1943, dawned with inauspiciously bad weather. Fog and rain shrouded both the departure airfields, Jackson's and Ward's but, as the forecasters had predicted, by 07:30 the fog began to dissipate. The first C-47 took off at 08:20. The formation of 79 C-47s, each carrying 19 or 20 paratroops, was divided into three flights. The first, consisting of 24 C-47s from the 403rd Troop Carrier Group from Jackson's, carried 1st Battalion, 503rd Parachute Infantry Regiment. The second, of 31 C-47s from the 375th Troop Carrier Group from Ward's, carried the 2nd Battalion, 503rd Parachute Infantry Regiment. The third, consisting of 24 C-47s of 317th Troop Carrier Group, from Jackson's, carried the 3rd Battalion, 503rd Parachute Infantry Regiment. Each battalion had its own drop zone. The transports were escorted by 48 P-38 Lightning fighters from the 35th and 475th Fighter Groups, 12 P-39 Airacobras from the 36th Fighter Squadron, 8th Fighter Group and 48 P-47 Thunderbolts from the 348th Fighter Group.

When Kenney informed MacArthur that he planned to observe the operation from a B-17, MacArthur reminded Kenney of his orders to keep out of combat, orders that Brigadier General Kenneth Walker had disobeyed at the cost of his life. Kenney went over the reasons why he thought he should go, ending with "They were my kids and I was going to see them do their stuff." MacArthur replied "You're right, George, we'll both go. They're my kids, too."

Three hundred and two aircraft from eight different airfields in the Moresby and Dobodura areas, made a rendezvous over Tsili Tsili at 10:07, flying through clouds, passes in the mountains, and over the top. "Not a single squadron," wrote General Kenney, "did any circling or stalling around but all slid into place like clockwork and proceeded on the final flight down the Watut Valley, turned to the right down the Markham, and went directly to the target." Leading the formation were 48 B-25s from the 38th and 345th Bombardment Groups whose job was to "sanitise" the drop zones by dropping their loads of sixty 20-pound (9.1 kg) fragmentation bombs and strafing with the eight .50-calibre machine guns mounted in their noses. They were followed by seven A-20s of the 3rd Bombardment Group (Light). Each carried four M10 smoke tanks mounted under the wings. The smoke tanks were each filled with 19 US gallons (72 L) of the smoke agent FS. In two groups of two and one of three flying at 250 feet (76 m) at 225 mph (362 km/h), they laid three smoke curtains adjacent to the three drop zones. The lead aircraft discharged two tanks, waited four seconds, then discharged the other two. The following aircraft went through the same procedure, creating a slight overlap to insure a continuous screen. Conditions were favourable, while the 85% humidity kept the screens effective for five minutes and stopped their dispersal for ten.

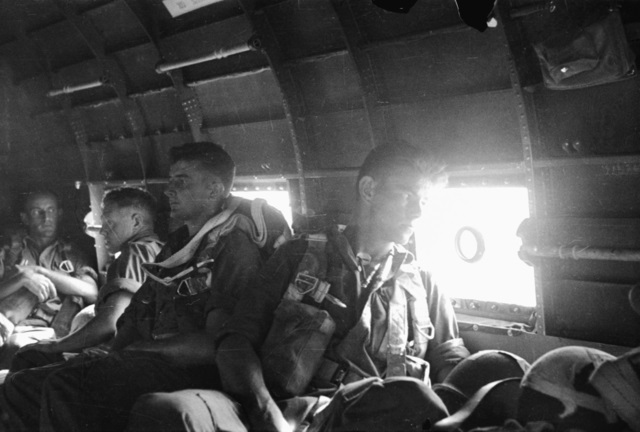
Gunners of the 2/4th Field Regiment en route to Nadzab

Next came the C-47s, flying at 400 to 500 feet (122 to 152 m) at 100 to 105 mph (161 to 169 km/h). Dropping commenced at 10:22. Each aircraft dropped all its men in ten seconds and the whole regiment was unloaded in four and a half minutes. Following the transports came five B-17s with their racks loaded with 300 lb (140 kg) packages with parachutes, to be dropped to the paratroopers on call by panel signals as they needed them. This mobile supply unit stayed for much of the day, eventually dropping 15 tons of supplies. A group of 24 B-24s and four B-17s, which left the column just before the junction of the Watut and the Markham attacked the Japanese defensive position at Heath's Plantation, about halfway between Nadzab and Lae. Five B-25 weather aircraft were used along the route and over the passes, to keep the units informed on weather to be encountered during their flights to the rendezvous. Generals MacArthur, Kenney, and Vasey observed the operation, from separate B-17s. Later, MacArthur received the Air Medal for having "personally led the American paratroopers" and "skilfully directed this historic operation". During the operation, including the bombing of Heath's, a total of 92 long tons (93 t) of high-explosive bombs was dropped, 32 long tons (33 t) of fragmentation bombs were dropped and 42,580 rounds of .50 calibre and 5,180 rounds of .30 calibre ammunition were expended.

No air opposition was encountered, and only one C-47 failed to make the drop. Its cargo door blew off during the flight, damaging its elevator. It safely returned to base. Three paratroopers were killed in the drop; two fell to their deaths when their parachutes malfunctioned while another landed in a tree and then fell some 66 feet (20 m) to the ground. There were 33 minor injuries caused by rough landings. The three battalions met no opposition on the ground and formed up in their assembly areas. This took some time due to the tropical heat and the high grass.

Five C-47s of the 375th Troop Carrier Group carrying the gunners of the 2/4th Field Regiment took off from Ward's Airfield after the main force and landed at Tsili Tsili. After an hour on the ground, they set out for Nadzab. Most jumped from the first two aircraft. The next three aircraft dropped equipment, including the dismantled guns. The "pushers out" followed when the aircraft made a second pass over the drop. One Australian injured his shoulder in the drop. The gunners then had to locate and assemble their guns in the tall grass. Enough parts were found to assemble one gun and have it ready for firing within two and a half hours of dropping, although to maintain surprise they did not carry out registration fire until morning. It took three days to find the missing parts and assemble the other gun. At 15:15, two B-17s dropped 192 boxes of ammunition. Their dropping was accurate, but some boxes of ammunition tore away from their parachutes.

=== Follow-up ===
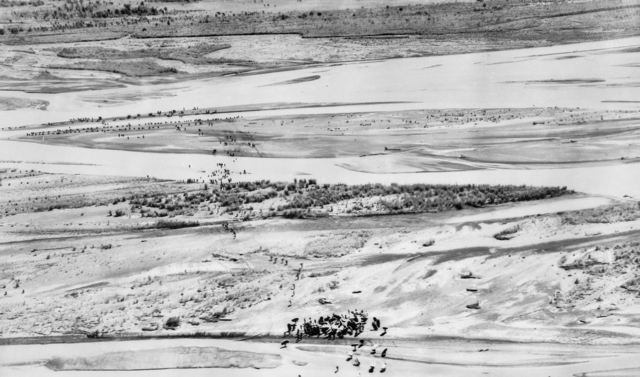
Lieutenant Colonel J. T. Lang's Force crossing the Markham River on the way to Nadzab, after an overland march from Tsili Tsili

Meanwhile, a force under Lieutenant Colonel J. T. Lang, consisting of the 2/2nd Pioneer Battalion, 2/6th Field Company, and detachments from the 7th Division Signals, 2/5th Field Ambulance and ANGAU, with 760 native carriers, set out from Tsili Tsili on 2 September. Most of the force moved overland, reaching Kirkland's Crossing on 4 September, where it rendezvoused with B Company, Papuan Infantry Battalion. That night, a party of engineers and pioneers set out from Tsili Tsili in 20 small craft, sailed and paddled down the Watut and Markham Rivers to join Lang's force at Kirkland's Crossing. The small river-borne task force included ten British 5-ton folding assault boats and Hoehn military folboats. which met up with 2/6th Independent Company commandos who had reconnoitred the proposed crossing area with eight of these folboats the day before. While neither river was deep, both were fast flowing, with shoals and hidden snags. Three boats were lost with their equipment and one man drowned. On the morning of 5 September, Lang's force was treated to the sight of the air force passing overhead. At this point, the Markham River formed three arms, separated by broad sand bars. Two were fordable but the other was deep and flowing at 5 knots (9.3 km/h; 5.8 mph). Using the folding boats and local timber, they constructed a pontoon bridge, allowing the whole force to cross the river safely with all their equipment. That evening, they reached the Americans' position.

The next day they went to work on the airstrip with hand tools. Trees were felled, potholes filled in and a windsock erected. Fourteen gliders were supposed to fly in three light tractors, three mowers, a wheeled rake and other engineering equipment from Dobodura. Because the lack of opposition made immediate resupply non-urgent, and because he had doubts about the proficiency of the glider pilots, whom he knew had undergone only minimal training, General Blamey decided that the glider operation was not worth the risk to the glider pilots or their passengers and cancelled it, substituting instead the afternoon supply run by specially modified B-17s. Lacking mowers, the Kunai grass was cut by hand by the pioneers, sappers, paratroops and native civilians and burned, causing the destruction of some stores and equipment that had been lost in the long grass and "a swirl of black dust". By 11:00 on 6 September, the 1,500 feet (460 m) strip – which had not been used for over a year – had been extended to 3,300 feet (1,000 m).

The first plane to land was an L-4 Piper Cub at 0940 6 September, bringing with it Lieutenant Colonel Harry G. Woodbury Jr., the commander of the U.S. Army's 871st Airborne Engineer Aviation Battalion. Three transports followed, nearly running down some of the throng working on the strip. Another 40 aircraft followed in the afternoon, many containing American and Australian engineers. The 871st followed the next day with its small air-portable bulldozers and graders. They located a site for a new airstrip, which became known as No. 1, the existing one becoming No. 2. The site proved to be an excellent one; an old, dry riverbed with soil largely composed of gravel. A gravel base and steel plank was laid to accommodate the fighters based at Tsili Tsili that were in danger of bogging down when the weather deteriorated. By the end of October there were four airstrips at Nadzab, one of which was 6,000 feet (1,800 m) long and sealed with bitumen.

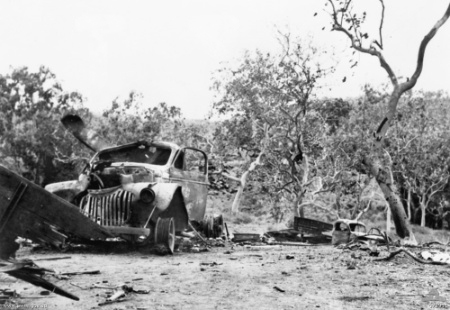
Two of five trucks carrying members of the 2/33rd Infantry Battalion and the 158th General Transport Company which were destroyed when a B-24 Liberator bomber crashed into the marshalling park near Jackson's Airfield on 7 September 1943

While engineers and anti-aircraft gunners arrived from Tsili Tsili, no infantry arrived from Port Moresby on 6 September because of bad flying weather over the Owen Stanley Range, although the 2/25th Infantry Battalion was flown to Tsili Tsili. On 7 September, reveille was sounded for the 2/33rd Infantry Battalion at 03:30 and the unit boarded trucks of the 158th General Transport Company that took it to marshalling areas near the airfields in preparation for the movement to Nadzab. At 04:20, B-24 Liberator 42-40682 "Pride of the Cornhuskers" of the 43rd Bombardment Group piloted by 2nd Lieutenant Howard Wood set out from Jackson's Airfield on a reconnaissance sortie to Rabaul, with a full load of 2,800 imperial gallons (13,000 L) of fuel and four 500 lb (230 kg) bombs. It clipped a tree at the end of the runway, crashed into two other trees and exploded, killing all eleven crewmen on board instantly and spraying burning fuel over a large area. Five of the 158th General Transport Company's trucks containing men of the 2/33rd Infantry Battalion were hit and burst into flames. Every man in those trucks was killed or injured; 15 were killed outright, 44 died of their wounds and 92 were injured but survived. Despite the disaster, the 2/33rd Infantry Battalion flew out to Tsili Tsili as scheduled.

Due to the unpredictable weather, aircraft continued to arrive at Nadzab sporadically. Only the 2/25th Infantry Battalion and part of the 2/33rd had reached Nadzab by the morning of 8 September when Vasey ordered the commander of the 25th Infantry Brigade, Brigadier Ken Eather, to initiate the advance on Lae. That day there were 112 landings at Nadzab. On 9 September, as the advance began, the rest of the 2/33rd Infantry Battalion reached Nadzab from Tsili Tsili, but while there were 116 landings at Nadzab, bad weather prevented the 2/31st Infantry Battalion from leaving Port Moresby. Finally, on 12 September, after three non-flying days, the 2/31st Infantry Battalion reached Nadzab on some of the 130 landings on the two strips at Nadzab that day.

On 13 September, a platoon of the 2/25th Infantry Battalion came under very heavy fire from a concealed Japanese machine gun near Heath's Plantation that wounded a number of Australians, including Corporal W. H. (Billy) Richards, and halted the platoon's advance. Private Richard Kelliher suddenly, on his own initiative, dashed toward the post and hurled two grenades at it, which killed some of the Japanese defenders but not all. He returned to his section, seized a Bren gun, dashed back to the enemy post and silenced it. He then asked permission to go out again to rescue the wounded Richards, which he accomplished successfully under heavy fire from another enemy position. Kelliher was awarded the Victoria Cross.

North of the main advance, a patrol from Lieutenant Colonel John J. Tolson's 3rd Battalion, 503rd Parachute Infantry Regiment, encountered a force of 200 Japanese crossing the Bumbu River on 15 September. The Americans engaged the Japanese force and reported inflicting heavy losses. The arrival of that day of the first units of Brigadier Ivan Dougherty's 21st Infantry Brigade at Nadzab at last allowed the paratroopers to be relieved.

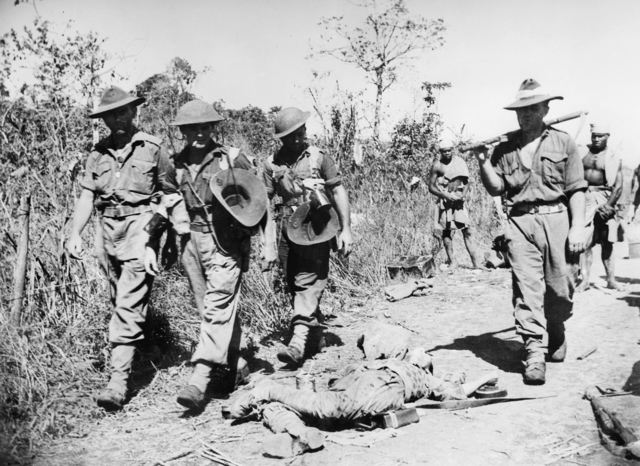
Australian troops file past a dead Japanese soldier on their way into Lae.

By this time, the 9th Division was about 1.5 miles (2.4 km) East of Lae, while the 7th Division was 7 miles (11 km) away and "it appeared an odds-on bet that the 9th would reach Lae first". The 7th Division resumed its advance at dawn on 16 September. The last ten Japanese troops facing the 2/33rd Infantry Battalion were killed and the 2/25th Infantry Battalion passed through its position and headed for Lae. As they moved down the Markham Valley Road, they occasionally encountered sick Japanese soldiers who held the column momentarily. Brigadier Eather came up in his jeep and started urging the diggers to hurry up. They were unimpressed. Eather, armed with a pistol, then acted as leading scout, with his troops following in a column of route behind him. The column entered Lae unopposed by the Japanese but aircraft of the Fifth Air Force strafed the 2/33rd Infantry Battalion and dropped parachute fragmentation bombs, wounding two men. Whitehead soon received a message sent in the clear from Vasey that read: "Only the Fifth Air Force bombers are preventing me from entering Lae." By early afternoon, the 2/31st Infantry Battalion reached the Lae airfield where it killed 15 Japanese soldiers and captured one. The 25th Infantry Brigade then came under fire from the 9th Division's 25-pounders, wounding one soldier. Vasey and Eather tried every available means to inform Wootten of the situation. A message eventually reached him through RAAF channels at 14:25 and the artillery was silenced.

=== Japanese withdrawal ===
Colonel Watanabe, commander of 14th Field Artillery Regiment, thought that if there were artillery troops, no matter what the situation, it was unjustifiable if they could not fire a shot on the battlefield. And since the fighting strength was small and the men were tired, one cannon would be enough. He decided that they must also carry some shells, and encouraging his own troops he set out for Sarawaged. Soldiers who were carrying insufficient food for themselves should not have had to carry 50 kilograms of mountain gun bits and pieces. Officers and men took it in turns and several at time carried these as they climbed the steep slopes. Naturally, the officers and men sympathised with the Regimental Commander and clung on to the rocks with truly formidable spirit. However, the Division Commander came to know about it. He was deeply stirred by their sense of responsibility but could not overlook their suffering, and he finally issued a divisional order that they should cease this. On the Sarawaged Mountain the Regiment Commander and his subordinates, with tears in their eyes, bade a formal farewell to this, the last of the Regiment's guns.

— Lieutenant General Kane Yoshihara

On 8 September, Adachi ordered Nakano to abandon Salamaua and fall back on Lae. Nakano had already evacuated his hospital patients and artillery to Lae. On 11 September, his main body began to withdraw. By this time, it was clear that Blamey intended to cut off and destroy the 51st Division. After discussing the matter with Imperial General Headquarters in Tokyo, Imamura and Adachi called off their plans to capture Bena Bena and Mount Hagen and instructed Nakano and Shoge to move overland to the north coast of the Huon Peninsula while the 20th Division moved from Madang to Finschhafen, sending one regiment down the Ramu valley to assist the 51st Division. The Salamaua garrison assembled at Lae on 14 September, and the Japanese evacuated the town over the next few days. It was a retreating band that contacted the 3rd Battalion, 503rd Parachute Infantry Regiment. The Japanese hurriedly altered their route before the Australians could intercept them.

Crossing the Saruwaged Range proved to be a gruelling test of endurance for the Japanese soldiers. They started out with ten days' rations but this was exhausted by the time they reached Mount Salawaket. The 51st Division had already abandoned most of its heavy equipment; now, many soldiers threw away their rifles. "The Sarawaged crossing", wrote Lieutenant General Kane Yoshihara, "took far longer than had been expected, and its difficulties were beyond discussion. Near the mountain summits the cold was intense and sleep was quite impossible all the cold night; they could only doze beside the fire. Squalls came, the ice spread and they advanced through snow under this tropical sky. Gradually the road they were climbing became a descending slope, but the inclination was so steep that if they missed their footing they would fall thousands and thousands of feet – and how many men lost their lives like that!"

In the end, the Japanese Army could take pride in conducting a creditable defence in the face of an impossible tactical situation. "Fortune and Nature, however, favoured a valiant defender despite the equally valiant striving of the attackers."

== Aftermath ==
=== Casualties ===
The 503rd Parachute Infantry lost three men killed and 33 injured in the jump. Another eight were killed and 12 wounded in action against the Japanese, and 26 were evacuated sick. The 2/5th Field Ambulance treated 55 jump casualties on 7 September. Between 5 and 19 September, the 7th Division reported 38 killed and 104 wounded, while another 138 were evacuated sick. To this must be added the 11 Americans and 59 Australians killed and 92 Australians injured in the air crash at Jackson's Airfield. Thus, 119 Allied servicemen were killed, 241 wounded or injured, and 166 evacuated sick. Japanese casualties were estimated at 2,200, but it is impossible to apportion them between the 7th and 9th Divisions.

=== Base development ===
The development of Nadzab depended on heavy construction equipment which had to be landed at Lae and moved over the Markham Valley Road. The job of improving the road was assigned to the 842nd Engineer Aviation Battalion, which arrived at Lae on 20 September but after a few days' work it was ordered to relieve the 871st Airborne Aviation Battalion at Nadzab. The 842nd reached Nadzab on 4 October but a combination of unseasonable rainfall and heavy military traffic destroyed the road surface and closed the road, forcing Nadzab to be supplied from Lae by air. The 842nd then had to resume work on the road, this time from the Nadzab end. Heavy rain was experienced on 46 of the next 60 days. The road was reopened on 15 December, allowing the 836th, 839th, 868th and 1881st Engineer Aviation Battalions and No. 62 Works Wing RAAF to move to Nadzab to work on the development of the airbase.

The airbase would eventually consist of four all-weather airfields. No 1 had a 6,000 feet (1,800 m) by 100-foot (30 m) runway surfaced with Marsden Matting and a 7,000 feet (2,100 m) by 100-foot (30 m) runway surfaced with bitumen. No. 2 had a 4,000 feet (1,200 m) by 100-foot (30 m) runway partially surfaced with bitumen. No. 3 had a 7,000 feet (2,100 m) by 100-foot (30 m) runway surfaced with bitumen in the centre with 1,000 feet (300 m) of Marsden mat at either end. No. 4, an RAAF airfield named Newton after Flight Lieutenant William Ellis Newton, had two parallel 6,000 feet (1,800 m) by 100-foot (30 m) runways surfaced with bitumen. Nadzab became the Allied Air Forces' main base in New Guinea.

=== Outcome ===
General Blamey declared the capture of Lae and Salamaua to be "a signal step on the road to Victory". Tolson described the 503rd Parachute Infantry Regiment's operation at Nadzab as "probably the classic text-book airborne operation of World War II". Coming after the impressive but flawed performance of the airborne arm in the Allied invasion of Sicily, Nadzab influenced thinking about the value of airborne operations.

However, the impact was far greater than anyone on the Allied side realised, and the ramifications went far beyond New Guinea. Imperial General Headquarters had regarded the defeats in the Guadalcanal Campaign and Battle of Buna–Gona as setbacks only, and had continued to plan offensives in the South West Pacific. Now it concluded that the Japanese position was over-extended. A new defensive line was drawn running through Western New Guinea, the Caroline Islands and the Mariana Islands. Henceforth, positions beyond that line would be held as an outpost line. General Imamura was now charged not with winning a decisive victory, but only with holding on as long as possible so as to delay the Allied advance.
