= Anton Reznicek =

North American botanist

Anton 'Tony' Albert Reznicek
- Born: 1950
- Education: University of Guelph, B.Sc., 1971; University of Toronto, M.Sc, 1973; University of Toronto, Ph.D., 1978
- Scientific career
- Institutions: University of Michigan Herbarium
- Thesis: The Taxonomy of the Stellulatae group of Carex in North America (1978)

Anton 'Tony' Albert Reznicek (born 1950) is a botanist known best for his work on the sedge genus Carex and co-authorship of the Field Manual of Michigan Flora. He is currently curator emeritus at the University of Michigan Herbarium.

== Education ==
Reznicek's higher education began at the University of Guelph, where he received his bachelor's with honors in 1971. He completed his master's at the University of Toronto, where he completed his thesis The Taxonomy of Carex Series Lupulinae in Canada in 1973. Moving forward, he completed his Ph.D., also at the University of Toronto, where he wrote The Taxonomy of the Stellulatae group of Carex in North America. While at the University of Toronto, Reznicek met his wife Susan, a botanist herself who was studying arctic ecology.

== Scholarship ==
Reznicek has worked broadly in the field of botany, but is best known for his work on sedges, specifically the genus Carex. His work looks broadly at the systematics and evolution within this genus. While his work in more recent years has been centered in the Great Lakes region, Reznicek has done extensive work in Latin America. In addition to his work with sedges, Reznicek is known for co-authoring the Field Manual of Michigan Flora, a comprehensive work completed in collaboration with Edward Groesbeck Voss which enables users to identify several thousand plants known to Michigan. In addition to the print version, Reznicek has developed and maintained an online version of Michigan Flora.

== Honors ==
In 2006, a new species of sedge was named in Reznicek's honor: Carex reznicekii (Reznicek's sedge).
