= M10 smoke tank =

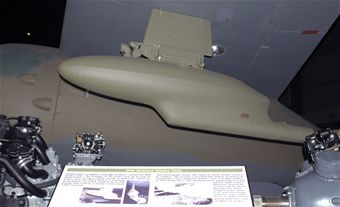
An M10 smoke tank or Smoke Curtain Installation, fitted below the outer wing of a Douglas A-20 medium bomber

The M10 smoke tank, also known as Smoke Curtain Installation, was an aircraft under wing tank used by the United States Army Air Forces to lay smoke screens or dispense chemical weapons such as tear gas. The tanks held a maximum of 30 US gallons (110 L), and weighed, when full 588 pounds (267 kg) and could lay a smoke screen about 2,000 feet (610 m) long.

The tanks were used to lay aerial smoke screens in combat during the airdrop of the US Army's 503rd Parachute Infantry Regiment paratroopers at Nadzab, New Guinea in 1943.
