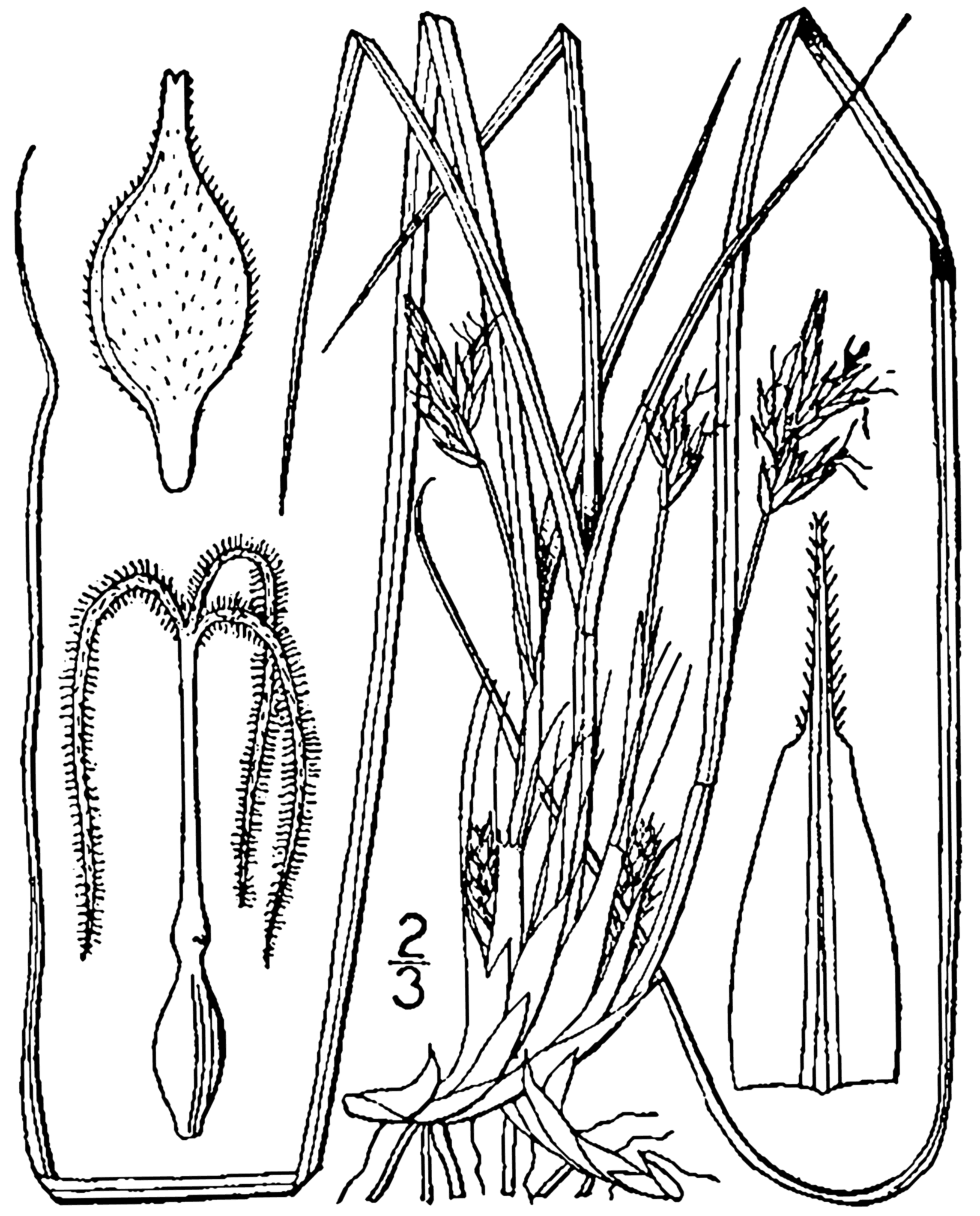

Scientific classification
- Kingdom: Plantae
- Clade: Tracheophytes
- Clade: Angiosperms
- Clade: Monocots
- Clade: Commelinids
- Order: Poales
- Family: Cyperaceae
- Genus: Carex
- Subgenus: Carex subg. Carex
- Section: Carex sect. Acrocystis
- Species: C. nigromarginata

Binomial name
- Carex nigromarginata Schwein.

= Carex nigromarginata =

Species of grass-like plant

Carex nigromarginata, also known as black edge sedge, is a North American sedge which grows on acid soils in dry woodland, thickets, and roadside, and similar ruderal habitats in partial shade or in full sun, often near streams at elevations of 10–800 m (33–2,625 ft). The plants grow in dense clumps, often forming circular patterns on forest floors or roadsides. 2n = 36.

== Range ==
Ontario, west to Illinois, Missouri, and Arkansas, south from Mississippi to South Carolina and northeast to Rhode Island, Connecticut and Massachusetts.
