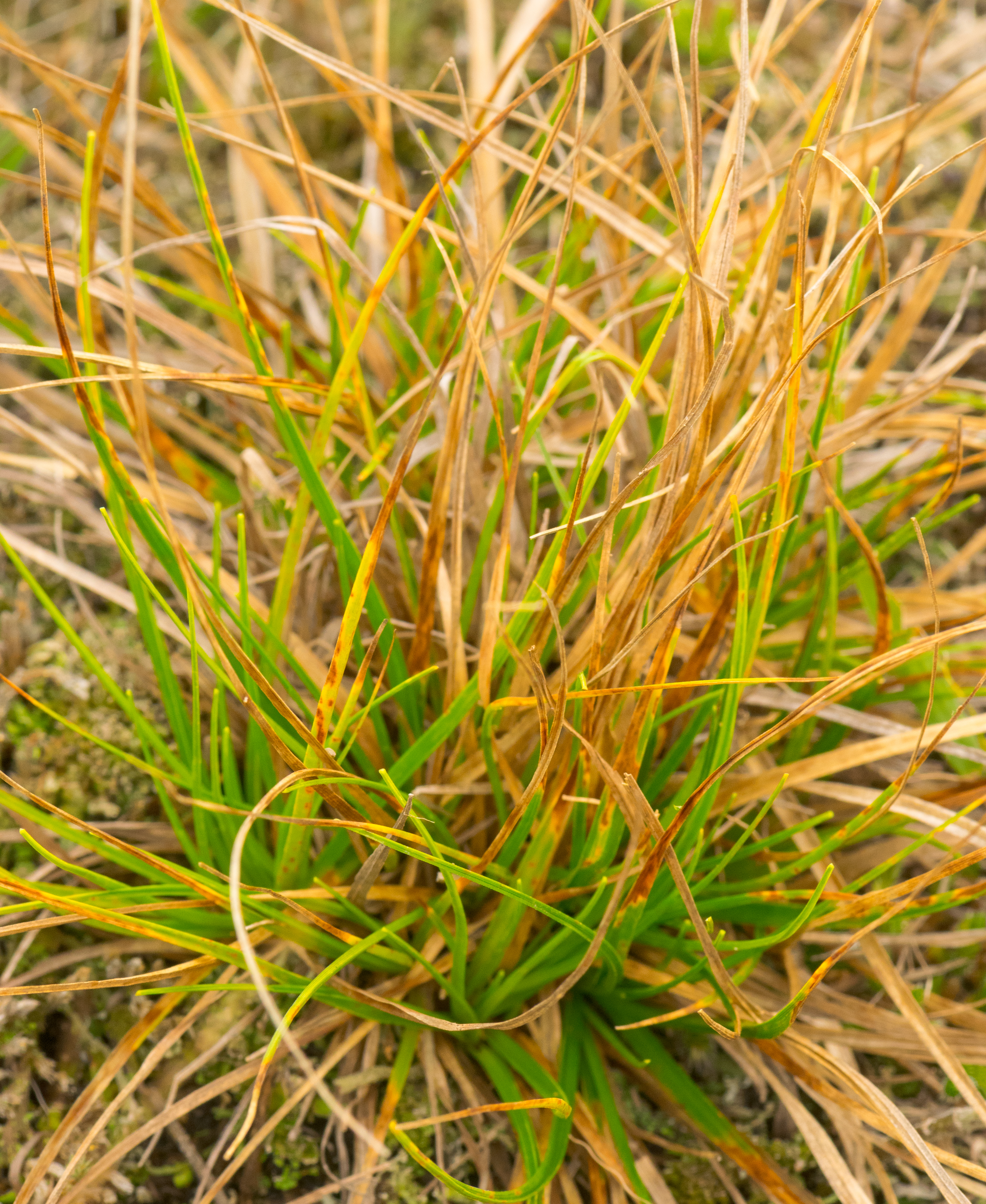
- In Wisconsin
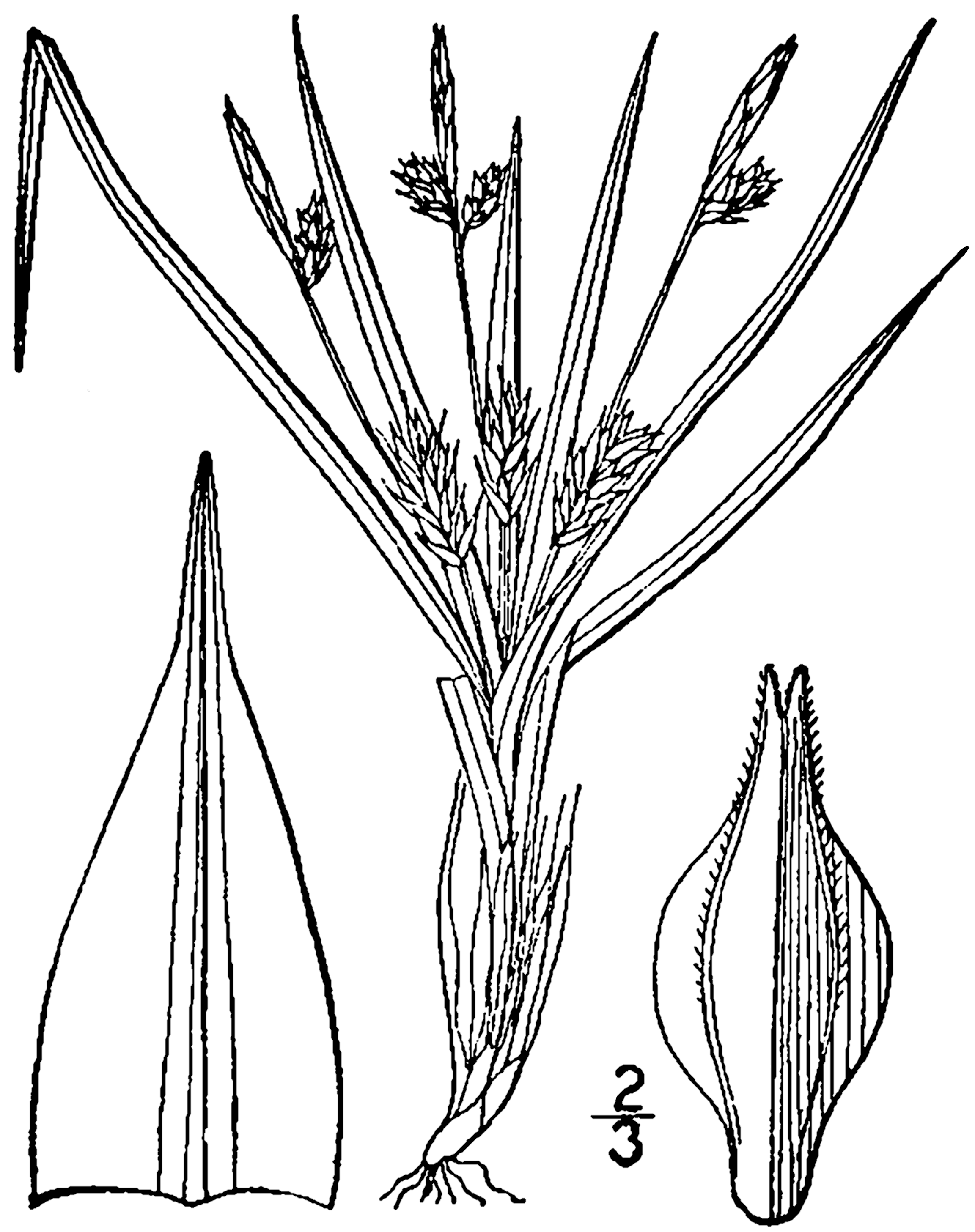
- Botanical illustration

Scientific classification
- Kingdom: Plantae
- Clade: Tracheophytes
- Clade: Angiosperms
- Clade: Monocots
- Clade: Commelinids
- Order: Poales
- Family: Cyperaceae
- Genus: Carex
- Species: C. umbellata

Binomial name
- Carex umbellata Willd.

Synonyms
- List: Carex abdita E.P.Bicknell; Carex umbellata subsp. abdita (E.P.Bicknell) W.Stone; Carex umbellata var. brachyrhina Piper; Carex umbellata var. brevirostris Boott; Carex umbellata var. vicina Dewey; Carex umbellata f. vicina (Dewey) Wiegand; Olotrema umbellata (Willd.) Raf.

= Carex umbellata =

Species of flowering plant

Carex umbellata, the parasol sedge, is a species of flowering plant in the genus Carex, native to Canada and the central and eastern US, and introduced to the Dominican Republic. Its seeds are dispersed by ants.
