= Edward Groesbeck Voss =

American lepidopterist (1929–2012)

Professor Edward Groesbeck Voss PhD, FLS
- Born: February 22, 1929; Delaware, Ohio, US
- Died: February 13, 2012 (aged 82); Ann Arbor, Michigan, US
- Education: Denison University (B.S.); University of Michigan (M.S., Ph.D.)
- Occupations: Botanist; Lepidopterist
- Employer: University of Michigan
- Notable work: Michigan Flora; Botanical Beachcombers

Edward Groesbeck "Ed" Voss (February 22, 1929 – February 13, 2012) was an American botanist and expert on taxonomic nomenclature.

Voss was born in Delaware, Ohio, received his Ph.D. degree from the University of Michigan in 1954 and spent his entire professional career at the University of Michigan, studying the plants and Lepidoptera of Michigan, his adopted state. He is best known for his three volume Michigan Flora (Volume 1 was honored by a Resolution of the Michigan Senate in 1972; Volume 2 received the H.A. Gleason Award of the New York Botanical Garden in 1986), plus his work on botanical history, especially his Botanical Beachcombers, and for his long service to the International Association of Plant Taxonomy, serving as secretary of the editorial committee of the International Code of Botanical Nomenclature from 1969 to 1981 and chairman from 1981 to 1987.

He also had a strong interest in Lepidoptera, publishing a number of papers on the butterflies and moths of northern Michigan.

He was a Fellow of the Linnean Society of London.

He died at Ann Arbor, Michigan on February 13, 2012, from a brain hemorrhage.

== Bibliography ==
- —— (1972). Michigan Flora: Gymnosperms and monocots. Cranbrook Institute of Science. ISBN 9780877370321.
- —— (1985). Michigan Flora: Dicots (Saururaceae-Cornaceae). Cranbrook Institute of Science. ISBN 9780877370321.
- —— (1996). Michigan Flora: Dicots (Pyrolaceae-Compositae). Cranbrook Institute of Science. ISBN 9780877370321.
- Voss, Edward Groesbeck; Reznicek, Dr. Anton A. (2012). Field Manual of Michigan Flora. University of Michigan Press. ISBN 978-0-472-11811-3.
- A. A. Reznicek; E. G. Voss; B. S. Walters (February 2011). "Michigan Flora Online". University of Michigan.
