= Trianon (sorority) =

Former American national sorority

- T
- Founded: December 28, 1929; 96 years ago Butler University
- Type: Social
- Affiliation: Independent
- Status: Defunct
- Defunct date: c. 1977
- Scope: National (US)
- Motto: "We Unite to Build"
- Pillars: Democracy, Fellowship, Scholarship, Service
- Member badge
- Colors: Royal blue and Gold
- Flower: Sunburst rose
- Publication: Trianon Key
- Chapters: 8
- Headquarters: United States

Trianon sorority was a national collegiate organization that operated in the United States from December 1929 to 1977.

== History ==
=== Origins ===
Trianon was formed from the merger of three college clubs in Ohio and Indiana. First, at the University of Cincinnati, in 1925, Dean Josephine P. Simrall assisted female students in creating the Campus Club. Next, in November 1926, several women formed a similar club on their campus, Butler University. In the spring of 1929, 37 female students at Miami University (of Ohio) formed the Miami Girl's Club.

Members of the three clubs convened on December 28 and 29, 1929 at Butler University, to form Trianon sorority, with December 28 being its founding date. This event came to be known as the first National Convention of Trianon. The purpose of Trianon was "to foster democratic ideals on the university of college campus; to encourage and support participation of non-Greek women students in university or college activities; to promote fellowship; to encourage high standards of scholarship; and to serve the university or college in every way possible."

The ties that bound the members of the three individual clubs were finances and values. "For a long time college campuses felt the need for more democratic social organizations to take care of girls whose principles revolted against fraternities into which only a selected few were bidden and whose dues and fees were outside the limit of the average girl's allowance".

=== Expansion ===
Throughout the 1930s, the members of Trianon worked to create official symbols, insignia, rituals, bylaws, and policies. An alumna club and a mother's club were created in 1933. In 1938, however, the Miami chapter struggled to recruit new members; "...several years later it [Miami] had depreciated so in value that the national organization of Trianon was forced to sever relations with this unit".

In the 1940s and 1950s, the sorority maintained two collegiate chapters, Butler and Cincinnati. According to the Trianon Key, members assisted with the war effort during World War II. In 1947, the first official sorority manual was printed. In 1949, a Life Membership program was offered to alumnae.

In 1959, the sorority's official magazine ceased publication. One year later, the Cincinnati chapter "had only two members but stayed alive". The sorority was still active in the 1960s. In 1964, the Cincinnati chapter initiated nine new members. A national convention met the following year. The Trianon pledge manual recorded sorority data through 1967.

In the spring of 1973, only two active members remained in the Butler University chapter. Rush was held and four young women pledged to the sorority. Because there were not enough active members to act as sorority "mothers", alumna were used, including founding sorority member Priscilla Shearer Smith. The following fall, seven women pledged to the sorority. The Butler chapter also pledged and initiated the first sorority member of African-American descent at Butler.

A national convention was held in Nashville, Indiana in the spring of 1974. Some Cincinnati alumnae attended. Another national convention was held in Covington, Kentucky, just outside Cincinnati.

=== Demise ===
The circumstances and exact dates of the sorority's formal dissolution, if there was such, are unknown. Butler University's archives have their chapter active as of 1974 and it is known to have been active until at least May 1977. Nothing is known about the demise of the Cincinnati chapter. Trianon Sorority is now a defunct organization.

== Symbols ==
The sorority's membership pin had "a yellow gold chevron-like base supporting a cluster of peaks upon which the letter "T" is superimposed. It may be plain or jeweled as follows: four pearls and three blue sapphires in the base; white sapphire or diamond above the "T". The pearls arising from the base are symbolic of the other units of the organization. The four pearls in the base represent the four ideals of our organization: democracy, fellowship, scholarship, and service. The three blue sapphires within the points of the base represent the three mother unites of the national organization".

The sorority's pledge pin was a "royal blue equilateral triangle each side of which forms part of the base of a gold obtuse-angled triangle. This pin is symbolical of the three founding units of the national organization. The blue is for loyalty to school and all things true, and gold is for golden deeds".

The coat-of-arms was called a crest. "The crest again emphasizes the idea of true friendship. At the top of the crest is a sunburst rose, the flower of the organization- the rose of truth. Under the rose are clasped hands of friendship, resting on a column denoting strength- a strong friendship. The clasped hands resting on the column forming a "T" standing on the shield, the shield of courage. At the base we find the motto "We Unite to Build".

Its motto was "We Unite to Build". Its flower was the sunburst rose. Its colors were royal blue and gold.

=== Creed ===
The creed of Trianon was:

Trianon, Trianon, in you we do believe. We believe in your work, your success, your ideals. We believe that to every girl who claims you, you are a light that leads the way to friendship, work, and healthy fun. We believe in your organization, born in the spirit of independence and incorporating the high ideals of democracy, friendship, scholarship, and service. And so to you, we come with grateful hearts, thankful for the torch you have given us to bear, for friends to cherish, tasks to do, and traditions to carry on through the years. O, Trianon, in you we do believe.

Prayer
Father in Heaven,
We thank Thee in song
for showering blessings
O'er Trianon.
Grant us they mercy
And thus make us strong,
stay with our Trianon.
--Written by Joyce Fraze Yarbrough (Butler)
Tune: Melody in F

Opening Hymn
'O, Trianon, we come to thee
With hearts united all as one
Enrich our souls with friendship true
To give us joy till life is done.
--Written by Betty Whiley (Miami)

Closing Hymn
O Trianon, O Trianon
With voices full we sing thy praise
Shine on in glory brighter
While thy banner with our hearts
We raise.
--Written by Priscilla Shearer Smith (Butler)

== Membership ==
Initially, Trianon employed an open membership policy; interested students completed a formal application. Starting in 1957, open membership was no longer permitted. The Trianon pledge manual explained that "the definition of how a girl could become a candidate was changed from a written application to a girl being invited upon a favorable majority vote of active members".

== Chapters ==
Trianon may have installed up to eight chapters. Five of these are known and are as follows.

Chapter	Charter date and range	Institution	Location	Status	Ref.
Cincinnati	December 28, 1929 – 1968	University of Cincinnati	Cincinnati, Ohio	Inactive	(Note: Chapter formed from Campus Club (local), established in 1925.)
Butler	December 28, 1929 – 1974	Butler University	Indianapolis, Indiana	Inactive	(Note: The chapter formed from a predecessor group, established in 1926.)
Miami	December 28, 1929 – 1940	Miami University	Oxford, Ohio	Inactive	(Note: Chapter formed from the Miami Girls Club (local), established in 1929.)
DePaul	March 1930 – 193x ?	DePaul University	Chicago, Illinois	Inactive	(Note: Chapter formed from the Club (local).)
Ohio State	1931–1933	Ohio State University	Columbus, Ohio	Inactive	(Note: Chapter formed from the Campus Club (local), established in 1930.)
