= Phi Mu Delta =

American collegiate fraternity

- ΦΜΔ
- Founded: March 1, 1918; 108 years ago: University of Connecticut; University of New Hampshire; University of Vermont
- Type: Social
- Affiliation: NIC
- Status: Active
- Scope: National
- Pillars: Democracy, Service, Brotherhood
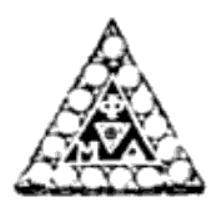
- Member badge
- Colors: Princeton orange, White, and Black
- Symbol: Lion, Scales of Justice
- Flower: Jonquil
- Mascot: Lion
- Patron saint: Abraham Lincoln
- Publication: The Triangle; The Lion Line
- Philanthropy: St. Jude Children's Research Hospital
- Chapters: 10 active
- Colonies: 3
- Headquarters: 4885-A McKnight Road #263; Pittsburgh, Pennsylvania 15237; United States
- Website: www.phimudelta.org

Phi Mu Delta (ΦΜΔ) is a national fraternity founded on March 1, 1918, at the Universities of Connecticut, New Hampshire, and Vermont. The fraternity is focused on the ideals of democracy, service, and brotherhood.

== History ==
Phi Mu Delta was originally derived from the National Federation of Commons Clubs (NFCC), which had formed at Wesleyan University in 1899. Rumblings of interest toward forming a Greek letter organization were the subject of extensive correspondence between chapters in 1917 and 1918. Clarence Dexter Pierce, one of the fraternity's founders, petitioned the NFCC to form a Greek letter fraternity at its 1918 NFCC meeting. He intended to bring all 19 active Commons Clubs chapters into this new organization which he had named Phi Mu Delta. At a subsequent Commons Club conclave at Massachusetts Agricultural College (now University of Massachusetts Amherst) held on March 1, 1918, chapters from four colleges initially agreed to join the organization. These were the University of Vermont, the University of New Hampshire, the University of Connecticut and Union College. But upon their return, alumni of Union College's Commons Club, upon hearing the news refused to allow their undergraduate chapter to join. Thus today, the Fraternity recognizes three founding chapters:

- Nu Alpha - Connecticut
- Nu Beta - New Hampshire
- Nu Gamma - Vermont

These three drew lots to determine which would be named the Alpha chapter; the Greek letter Nu was a reference to their New England region.

Phi Mu Delta became a junior member of the North American Interfraternity Conference (NIC) in 1923, and then a senior member in 1930. It remains a member of the NIC today.

The fraternity expanded slowly during the 1920s, merging or expanding to seven additional chapters by 1930. Expansion of the Fraternity was slowed during the great depression. Phi Mu Delta merged with another fraternity, Delta Alpha Pi in 1934–1935, gaining three chapters, all of which closed shortly afterward. In 1936 one of the founding chapters, the University of Vermont, also closed. By the end of World War II, the Connecticut chapter had also closed.

After the war the fraternity expanded more rapidly, coinciding with a general increase in fraternity enrollment. This trend petered out by the late 1960s, and by the late 1970s, the organization was making plans to shut down. A reorganization effort centered on the State College, Pennsylvania chapter, stabilized the fraternity and prompted a resurgence in growth. It was at this time that the chapter at the University of Vermont was recolonized. In the early 1980s, the organization rewrote its constitution. During the 1980s, the fraternity only gained one chapter, California University of Pennsylvania.

Since then the fraternity has expanded steadily. In 2006, the fraternity established an executive director position. In 2015, the National Office was moved to Westmont, New Jersey and then Pittsburgh, Pennsylvania in 2023.

== Symbols ==
The badge of the fraternity is a black triangle, bordered with pearls, with the letters Φ, Μ, and Δ, rendered in gold, and set about a sapphire center stone. The new member pin is a simple triangle, with three sections, each bearing one of the three colors of the fraternity along with the scales of justice.

The coat of arms displays a lion bearing a shield, under which runs a ribbon with the Greek letters of the fraternity's name. Its colors are Princeton orange, black, and white. Its flower is the jonquil.

The fraternity's new member manual is titled, The Oracle, and was first published in 1998. Its current edition was published in 2018.

== Chapters ==
The fraternity has ten active chapters.

== Notable members ==
Some of the notable members of the fraternity include:

- Roger Blough – Chairman of US Steel Corporation
- Bill Gardner – Secretary of State, New Hampshire
- Dan Gwadosky – former Secretary of State, Maine; Speaker of the House of Representatives
- Tyler Hinman – six-time winner of the American Crossword Puzzle Tournament and software developer
- Theodore H. Kattouf – former US Ambassador to the United Arab Emirates and Syria
- Chuck Mather – former football coach for the University of Kansas
- Dick Muri – Pierce County, Washington council member; former US Congressional candidate
- John Rigas – former CEO of Adelphia Communications Corporation; former majority franchise owner of the Buffalo Sabres (NHL)
- Robert Rounseville – tenor on Broadway and in opera
- George Wiley – civil rights leader; chemist
- Harrison Richardson – lawyer and politician from Maine
- Jim Hazlett – head football and baseball head coach for several universities in the northeastern United States
- Frank Burrill – Archbishop of Chicago for the Episcopal Church
- Peter George Peterson – businessman, investment banker, philanthropist, and author, who served as United States Secretary of Commerce in the Nixon Administration
- Leon J. LaPorte – retired United States Army General who served as Commander, 1st Cavalry Division from 1995 through 1997 and as Commander, United States Forces Korea until 2006.
