= Delta Alpha Pi (social) =

American collegiate social fraternity (1919–1935)

- ΔΑΠ
- Founded: November 22, 1919; 106 years ago Ohio Wesleyan University
- Type: Social
- Former affiliation: NIC
- Status: Merged
- Merge date: October 1935
- Successor: Phi Mu Delta
- Scope: National
- Member badge
- Colors: Red and White
- Symbol: Cross
- Flower: Ophelia rose
- Publication: The Cross and Shield
- Chapters: 6
- Headquarters: United States

Delta Alpha Pi (ΔΑΠ) was a social fraternity was founded in 1919 at Ohio Wesleyan University. Most chapters and alumni merged with Phi Mu Delta in 1935.

== History ==
Delta Alpha Pi was founded on November 22, 1919, at Ohio Wesleyan University in Delaware, Ohio. Its original name was Kappa Sigma Pi, but with an agreement with the local that would become the Beta chapter at Ohio State University, by 1921 the new organization settled on Delta Alpha Pi.

Its founders were:

- John H. Alspach
- Howard C. Cameron
- Carl L. Clugston
- Charles Melvin Coulter
- Barton R. Deming
- E. Frank Francis
- Douglas M. Gaither
- Robert B. Hartley
- Charles M. Hemstead
- Frank B. Jemison
- John A. King
- Stanley Mullen
- Donald H. Price
- Allen E. Rupp
- Vernie Seibert
- Donald Wogaman

The founders wanted to form a fraternity that would develop of Christian character. In 1927 Delta Alpha Pi became a junior member of the National Interfraternity Conference. As of October 1929, Alpha, Beta and Gamma chapters had houses, but Delta at NYU did not.

In the early years of the Great Depression, the chapters at Ohio Wesleyan University, University of Illinois and Butler University went inactive. In 1935, the decision was made to merge with Phi Mu Delta. However the chapter at Purdue University withdrew, eventually affiliating with Alpha Chi Rho. The remaining chapters and alumni merged into Phi Mu Delta in October 1935.

== Symbols ==
The Delta Alpha Pi coat of arms always featured Roman helmet in profile above a shield with a wavy silver border. At the top, was a passant lion holding an eight-pointed star. Below the shield was a banner with the fraternity's name.

The Delta Alpha Pi badge was a shield mounted on a cross of which only the ends were visible. Upon the black background were two crossed swords, above which were the Greek letters "ΔΑΠ".

The fraternity's colors were red and white. The flower was an Ophelia rose. Its semi-annual magazine was the Cross and Shield.

== Chapters ==
These were the chapters of Delta Alpha Pi and their status at the time of dissolution.

Name	Charter date and range	Institution	Location	Status	Ref.
Alpha	November 22, 1919 – 1933	Ohio Wesleyan University	Delaware, Ohio	Inactive	(Note: Chapter formed as Kappa Sigma Pi, but within two years the name was changed to Delta Alpha Pi with the merger of the Beta chapter at OSU into the new fraternity.)
Beta	October 20, 1921–1934	Ohio State University	Columbus, Ohio	Merged (ΦΜΔ)	(Note: Merged with the Mu Gamma chapter of Phi Mu Delta at the time of the national merger.)
Gamma	1924–1936	Purdue University	West Lafayette, Indiana	Withdrew (ΑΧΡ)	(Note: The chapter formed from the Pirathon Club (local), established in 1920. The chapter withdrew at the time of the national merger. It later became the Alpha Phi chapter of Alpha Chi Rho.)
Delta	1925–1934	New York University	New York, New York	Merged (ΦΜΔ)	(Note: This chapter originated from Alpha Phi fraternity (local). It became the Nu Kappa chapter of Phi Mu Delta at the time of the national merger.)
Epsilon	1927–1932	Butler University	Indianapolis, Indiana	Inactive	(Note: This chapter formed from the Butler Association, a local club established in 1919.)
Zeta	1927–1933	University of Illinois	Champaign, Illinois	Inactive	(Note: This chapter formed from Alpha Sigma Tau, a local fraternity established in 1923.)

== See also ==
- Phi Mu Delta
- List of social fraternities
