= Battle of the Pimple =

1943 battle of World War II

Battle of The Pimple
- Part of World War II, Pacific War
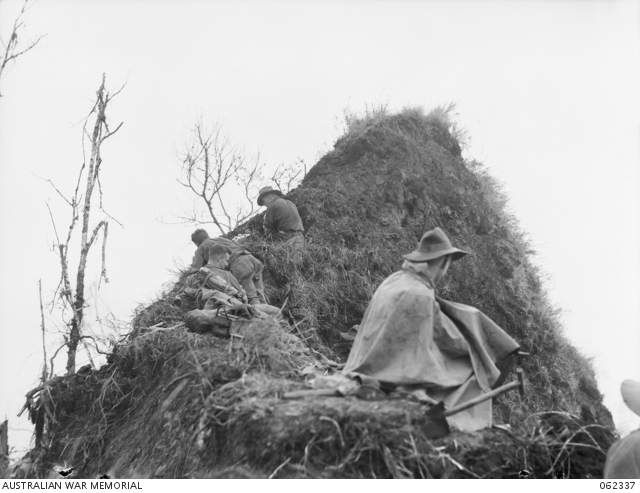
- Troops from the 2/16th Infantry Battalion after the battle
Date	27–28 December 1943
Location	Finisterre Range, Territory of New Guinea
Result	Allied victory

Belligerents
Australia	Imperial Japan

Commanders and leaders
(Australia) George Vasey (Australia) Garth Symington	(Empire of Japan) Masutaro Nakai

Units involved
2/16th Infantry Battalion	78th Infantry Regiment

Casualties and losses
3 killed, 8 wounded	28 killed

The Battle of the Pimple was part of the Markham and Ramu Valley – Finisterre Range campaign, which consisted of a number of battles fought by Australian and Japanese troops in Papua New Guinea in World War II. Fought on 27 and 28 December 1943, the battle took place as the Australians advanced towards the Japanese strong hold around Shaggy Ridge, and was a preliminary phase in their eventual capture of that position in January 1944. Supported by artillery, mortars, machine guns and fighter-bomber aircraft, the assault was made across a narrow frontage, which was usually not much wider than a single section. Two companies of Australian infantry were committed to the attack, with one securing the initial crest, while the other exploited the position and secured several other smaller features throughout the two days of fighting. In the aftermath, Japanese artillery harassed the Australians holding the position, and subjected them to several counter-attacks, which were eventually defeated.

== Background ==
After hard fighting in the Pacific throughout 1942, the following year Australian and US forces began to gain momentum against the Japanese, and were contemplating going on the offensive. In New Guinea, the bloody Battle of Buna–Gona had been fought to a conclusion in January, while a Japanese attempt to secure the vital airfield at Wau, near Salamaua, had also been repelled that month. Throughout mid-1943, the Australians had fought a campaign against the Japanese in the Salamaua region, as they had advanced east from Wau towards the Huon Gulf. In September, an amphibious landing near Lae was carried out in conjunction with an airborne assault on Nadzab, aimed at capturing Lae. At the same time, Australian troops, who had been reinforced by several US battalions, continued to keep up the pressure around Salamaua, which fell in mid-September around the same time as Lae. As the Allies sought to follow up the large number of Japanese troops that managed to withdraw from Lae, they subsequently launched the Huon Peninsula campaign.

After the 9th Division had secured Finschhafen and Sattelberg, the next major objective in New Guinea was to capture Shaggy Ridge in the Finisterre Ranges, a series of high positions held by Japanese infantry, supported with some artillery. This task was allocated to the Major General George Vasey's 7th Division, which had – after the capture of Lae – advanced to Dumpu before beginning an advance through the Markham and Ramu Valleys towards the Finisterre Ranges. In October, the 21st Infantry Brigade began a tentative push towards the foothills surrounding Shaggy Ridge, and in the middle of the month fought a sharp defensive action around John's Knoll and Trevor's Ridge after the Japanese counter-attacked an Australian force that had cut the main Japanese line of supply.

== Battle ==
Shortly after the fighting around John's Knoll, the 25th Infantry Brigade had relieved the 21st and had begun patrolling the area, while aerial reconnaissance attempted to locate the Japanese artillery, which was engaged by the guns of the 2/4th Field Regiment. Throughout the previous months, the Japanese had largely sought to avoid contact, but after several months Allied reconnaissance began detect a build up of Japanese troops. By early December, the Japanese began sending reinforcements south of Bogadjim through Saipa and Orgorunna. In response, the Australians began planning their own offensive to secure Shaggy Ridge, and the 21st Infantry Brigade subsequently took over from the 25th once again.

In order to assault Shaggy Ridge and the Kankiryo Saddle, the Australian 7th Division had to secure a foothold on the southern slope of the ridge around a position dubbed "The Pimple", which was one of three rocky outcrops, held by the Japanese on the ridge line. The Japanese troops defending the area were drawn from 2nd and 3rd Battalions of the 78th Infantry Regiment, which formed part of the Nakai Detachment under the command of Major General Masutaro Nakai, who was subordinated to the 18th Army. Australian estimates of the strength of these forces around the Pimple placed them at around three platoons. For two months the Pimple held up the Australian advance; and attempts by the Australians to find a way around the position had been thwarted. Australian commanders subsequently decided that a direct attack would be required in order to deny the Japanese the use of the position for observation purposes.

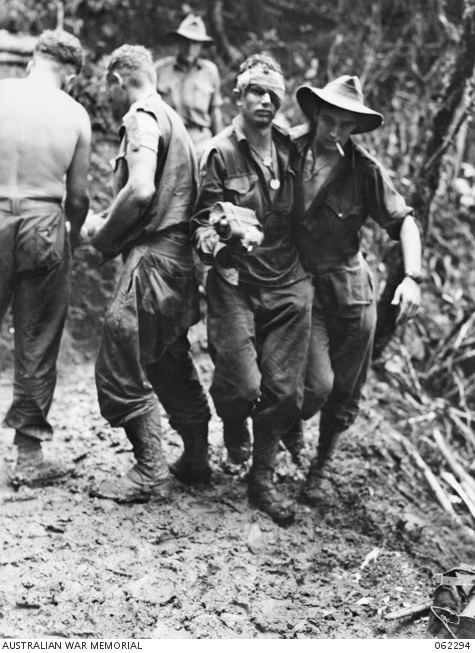
A wounded Australian is led towards medical attention. The wounded soldier, Corporal Merv Hall, later received the Distinguished Conduct Medal for his actions during the assault.

The 2/16th Infantry Battalion, temporarily under the command of Major Garth Symington, was given the task of attacking the Pimple, and exploiting 400 yards (370 m) beyond it. The 2/16th had been reinforced with hundreds of new troops after earlier losses, with many coming from the disbanded 16th Motor Regiment. The initial plan had been for the assault to begin on 21 December, but this was subsequently deferred so that the Australians could partake in Christmas celebrations. An elaborate fire support plan was implemented, including artillery and mortar preparations and support by fire positions, which included Vickers medium machine guns. In addition, Kittyhawk fighter-bombers from the US Fifth Air Force also attacked the position, with aerial control being provided by Boomerangs from No. 4 Squadron RAAF. Due to unpredictable weather, the final time of the assault was not set and in the early morning of 27 December 1943, as a thick haze of mist melted away from around The Pimple, the assault began with an air attack around 08:06 hours.

Following the one hour long preparation, the 2/16th went in with two companies leading the assault: 'B' Company in the lead, with 'D' Company following it up. At the same time, the 2/27th Infantry Battalion carried out a feint attack along the Faria River. Overhead, Vasey viewed the battle in a Piper Cub light aircraft. 'B' Company attacked with a "one up, two back" formation for its platoons. Ladders fashioned out of bamboo were brought up to help the infantry scale the steep shale cliffs, but these proved too difficult to maneouvre and were discarded in favour of climbing on hands and knees. The preparatory fires had the desired effect and for the most part the defenders were dazed, reducing the effectiveness of their resistance. However, on the left of the assault, the advance was held up by a pillbox that had to be attacked from the flank by a section from the right. Exploiting the position, the section began to establish themselves near the summit by around 09:46, while the rest of the platoon pushed 100 yards (91 m) further towards another small outcrop, clearing Japanese from their entrenchments. Following the arrival of the Australian company commander with an artillery forward observer, another platoon pushed through the second outcrop in an effort to further exploit the position, but found itself held up around "Green Sniper's Pimple", as it came up against a strongly held Japanese bunker.

'D' Company subsequently arrived to consolidate the position and relieved 'B' Company, digging in throughout the night, and cutting a track up towards the bunker. Just before first light, Australian engineers brought up makeshift chemical grenades which were thrown at the bunker to set it alight. Under the cover of an artillery smoke screen, one of the Australian platoons advanced up the eastern face of the ridge, in order to approach the flanks of the position. They took heavy fire, but secured the third outcrop by midday, and from there they were able to lay down covering fire for another assault on a fourth position along the ridge, which became known as "McCaughey's Knoll". This gave the Australians full possession of the Pimple, and from there they had observation as far as the north coast where they could see Madang.

== Aftermath ==
The attack was successful, driving the Japanese off the position on 28 December 1943; Australian losses during the main assault were low, with only three men killed and eight wounded. Japanese casualties reported by the Australians amounted to 28 killed. Australian troops held the Pimple against further counter-attacks and shelling, during which the 2/16th suffered further casualties. In mid-January 1944 further attacks were followed up against the main Japanese positions during the Battle of Shaggy Ridge. The capture of Shaggy Ridge was followed by the pursuit of the Japanese forces that withdrew towards Bogadjim on the north coast. From there, the Australians linked up with US and Australian forces that had advanced from Saidor as part of the drive along the coast from the Huon Peninsula. A further Japanese withdrawal occurred towards Madang and then Aitape. Madang was captured by Australian forces in late April 1944, while US forces landed at Aitape that same month, later fighting around the Driniumor River.
