= Battle of John's Knoll–Trevor's Ridge =

Battle during WW II

- Part of World War II, Pacific War
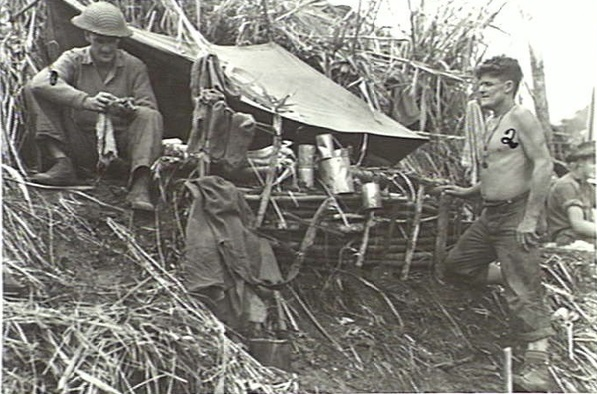
- Australian troops on John's Knoll after the battle
Date	12–13 October 1943
Location	Finisterre Range, Territory of New Guinea 6°S 147°E
Result	Allied victory

Belligerents
Australia	Japan

Commanders and leaders
(Australia) John Bishop	(Empire of Japan) Shoichi Kagawa

Units involved
2/27th Infantry Battalion	78th Infantry Regiment

Casualties and losses
7 killed 28 wounded	200 killed

The Battle of John's Knoll–Trevor's Ridge was fought from 12–13 October 1943 during World War II. The battle was part of the Markham and Ramu Valley – Finisterre Range campaign, which consisted of series of actions fought by Australian and Japanese troops in the Territory of New Guinea as the Australian 7th Division advanced through the foothills of the Finisterre Range from Dumpu towards Bogadjim, near Madang on the northern coast, following the capture of Lae in mid-September 1943.

The fighting around John's Knoll and Trevor's Ridge took place as the Australians advanced towards the main Japanese defensive positions around Shaggy Ridge and Kankiryo. When the Australians pushed onto the ridge, they cut off the Japanese supply line and in an effort to restore the situation, three companies of Japanese troops launched a counter-attack, supported by heavy machine guns, mortars and artillery, early on 12 October, focused mainly on the single Australian platoon holding John's Knoll. Fighting raged throughout the day before flanking attacks defeated the attack, allowing reinforcements to be brought up to the beleaguered position throughout the night, followed by a desperately needed resupply of ammunition the following morning.

== Background ==
During September 1943, Australian forces from Major General George Vasey's 7th Division, advancing from Nadzab, had captured Lae, as part of a pincer undertaken in conjunction with Major General George Wootten's 9th Division, which had advanced along the coast from the east of Lae. Heavy rain had held up the Australian advance and much of the garrison had managed to withdraw inland, prior to the capture of the town. To follow these forces up, the 9th Division's focus then shifted to the Huon Peninsula, while the 7th Division—following the capture of Kaiapit—was moved to Dumpu and Marawasa, to carry the Australian advance through the Ramu Valley and into the Finisterre Range, towards Bogadjim near Madang on the northern coast.

The area was defended by two battalions of the 78th Infantry Regiment, supported by the 26th Artillery Regiment and the 27th Independent Engineer Regiment. The II/78th and two companies of the III/78th were deployed forward around Kankiryo and Shaggy Ridge, with the I/78th spread out around Saipa and Yokopi and the remaining two companies of the III/78th at Yaula. In addition, the 239th Infantry Regiment held the rear around Madang, Erima and Bogadjim, along with 2,000 unassigned reinforcements. Overall, this was a force of about 12,000 men.

== Battle ==
During the Battle of Finschhafen in the 9th Division area, the Australian and Japanese commanders in the Markham and Ramu Valleys were ordered by their respective commands to limit their operations to minor actions, as the focus of the fighting, and resources, remained elsewhere. After concentrating his division in early October, Vasey ordered offensive patrolling. The 21st Brigade, under Brigadier Ivan Dougherty, was tasked with probing actions along the Faria River towards the Kankiryo Saddle. At the same time, the 25th Brigade was assigned to the same task in the Ramu Valley. In mid-October, the 21st Brigade's advance began with the South Australians from the 2/27th Infantry Battalion, under the command of Lieutenant Colonel John Bishop, leading the way, having been relieved of road construction duties around Kaigulin. Throughout 11 October, around Pallier's Hill, elements of the 2/14th Infantry Battalion had clashed with Japanese troops that were threatening to cut off the 2/27th's supply line to the south. Meanwhile, the 2/27th had continued to advance, securing two features to the east of Shaggy Ridge, these were dubbed "John's Knoll" and "Trevor's Ridge" by the Australians. Shortly afterwards, the 2/27th came under heavy attack by Japanese troops, starting early on 12 October.

The capture of John's Knoll threatened the Japanese supply lines between their forward positions along the Surinam River and, as a result, Captain Shoichi Kagawa, in command of II/78th, was ordered to retake the position. Consequently, Kagawa dispatched three companies from the Japanese main defensive position around Kankiryo, leaving late in the day on 11 October, to attack from the east. They would attack the flank of the Australian position on John's Knoll, which was known as "Key Point 3" to the Japanese. In support, they had four heavy machine guns, which were positioned at several locations to fire on John's Knoll from the east, west and south. There were also several artillery pieces positioned to the north-east on the other side of the main branch of the Faria River, which were positioned in a manner that allowed them to fire along the length of Trevor's Ridge on to the Australian position on John's Knoll at a distance of 5,800 yards (5,300 m).

Throughout the night, in front of their position on John's Knoll, the Australians had detected the movement of the Japanese force, and in the early morning a patrol was sent out. In the morning haze, the two groups briefly clashed, and then the Japanese artillery pieces and machine guns opened up. Two companies, equaling roughly 200 men, attacked the position in the first wave under the cover of heavy mortar fire. The main assault fell on John's Ridge, which was being held by an understrength platoon, commanded by Lieutenant Bob Johns. Assisted by clear fields of fire and the defensive qualities of their position, the Australian platoon was able to hold off the first assault and fighting continued throughout the day, with several attacks going in, before the Japanese assault was pushed back. At the height of the assault, the Australian brigade commander – Dougherty – approved a withdrawal, but the 2/27th's commanding officer, Bishop, determined that a counter-attack might restore the situation. Amidst heavy rain, the Australians counter-attacked with two platoons hitting the Japanese flanks. This allowed reinforcements to be pushed through to John's Knoll in the early evening. With ammunition running dangerously low for the Australian defenders, supplies were hurriedly pushed forward during the early morning, being brought up by native carriers across the Faria River. Casualties for the Australians amounted to seven killed and 28 wounded, while Japanese losses were 200 killed.

== Aftermath ==
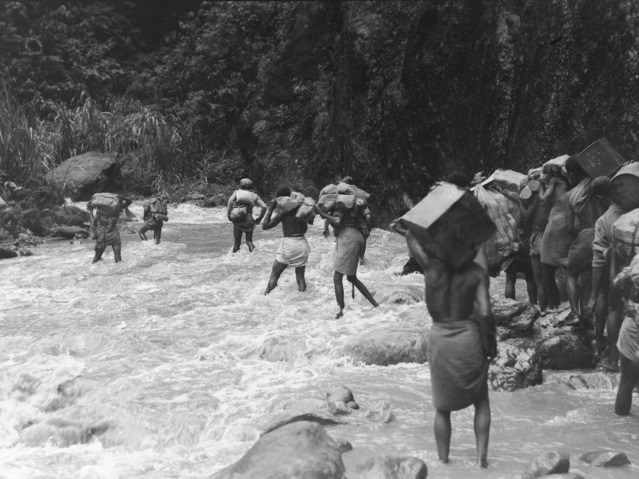
Native carriers bringing supplies across the Faria River to the Australians on John's Knoll after the battle

Author Philip Bradley wrote that the fighting at John's Knoll was "a key defensive action" of the campaign. Following the fighting on John's Knoll and Trevor's Ridge, the Japanese, having failed to re-establish their supply route, were forced adopt a defensive posture. Meanwhile, the Australian advance through the Finisterres continued towards Shaggy Ridge, a 5,000-foot (1,500 m) heavily wooded razor-back feature, that dominated the Japanese defensive position. A series of minor clashes followed as the Japanese withdrew towards the main defensive position around the Kankiryo Saddle, pursued by the 21st Brigade.

By the end of October, the 25th Brigade became the spearhead of the 7th Division. While the Australians waited for actions around the Huon Peninsula to conclude, they limited their actions to patrolling in order to prevent the Japanese in the area from launching an attack on the vital Gusap airfield and its associated infrastructure. Pushing out past the Mene River towards the Eapia River, while commandos from the 2/6th Commando Squadron pushed towards Orgoruna throughout November. In mid-December, the Australians—who had managed to ensconce themselves on the southern slope—were ready to launch their assault on Shaggy Ridge, starting with an attack on the Pimple, by elements of the 21st Brigade, which had taken over from the 25th. Throughout December and into January 1944, a series of actions were fought along the steep ridges, culminating with the capture of the Kankiryo Saddle and Crater Hill. Following this, the Australians pushed north towards Bogadjim and Madang, which was captured in mid-April.
