= Asiatic-Pacific theater =

Area of U.S. Pacific operations in World War II

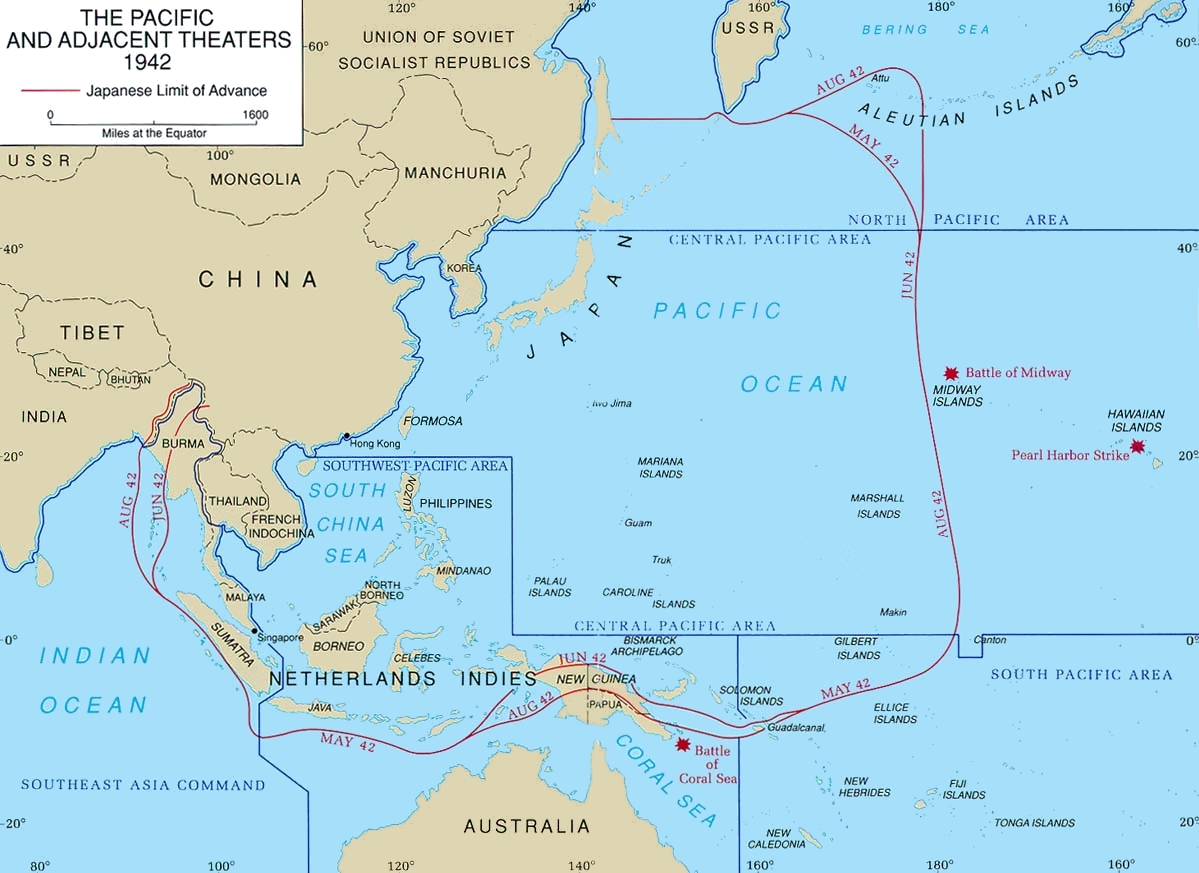
A map of the Asiatic-Pacific Theater showing its component areas. (The China-Burma-India Theater fell under the British-led South East Asia Command)

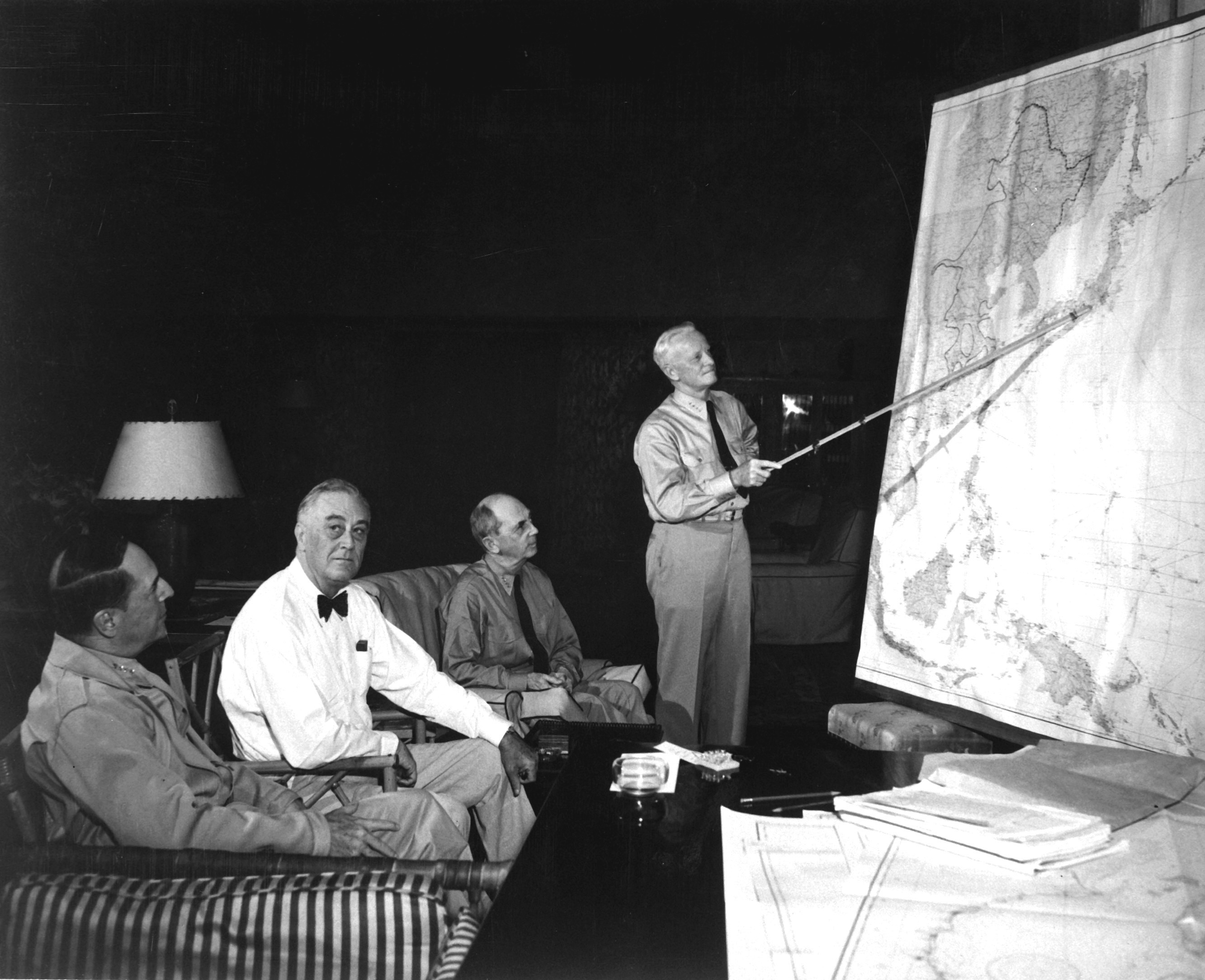
1944 Strategy Conference in Honolulu. Left to right: MacArthur, Roosevelt, Leahy, Nimitz. The discussion weighs the options of Formosa or the Philippine Islands as the next operational target in the Pacific theater.

The Asiatic-Pacific theater was the theater of operations of U.S. forces during World War II in and around the Pacific Ocean. From mid-1942 until the end of the war in 1945, there were two U.S. operational commands in the Pacific. The Pacific Ocean Areas (POA), divided into the Central Pacific Area, the North Pacific Area and the South Pacific Area, were commanded by Fleet Admiral Chester W. Nimitz, Commander-in-Chief Pacific Ocean Areas. The South West Pacific Area (SWPA) was commanded by General of the Army Douglas MacArthur, Supreme Allied Commander South West Pacific Area. During 1945, the United States added the United States Strategic Air Forces in the Pacific, commanded by General Carl A. Spaatz.

Because of the complementary roles of the United States Army and the United States Navy in conducting war, the Pacific Theater had no single Allied or U.S. commander (comparable to General of the Army Dwight D. Eisenhower in the European Theater of Operations). No actual command existed; rather, the Asiatic-Pacific Theater was divided into SWPA, POA, and other forces and theaters, such as the China Burma India Theater.

== Major campaigns and battles ==
=== Pacific Ocean Area ===
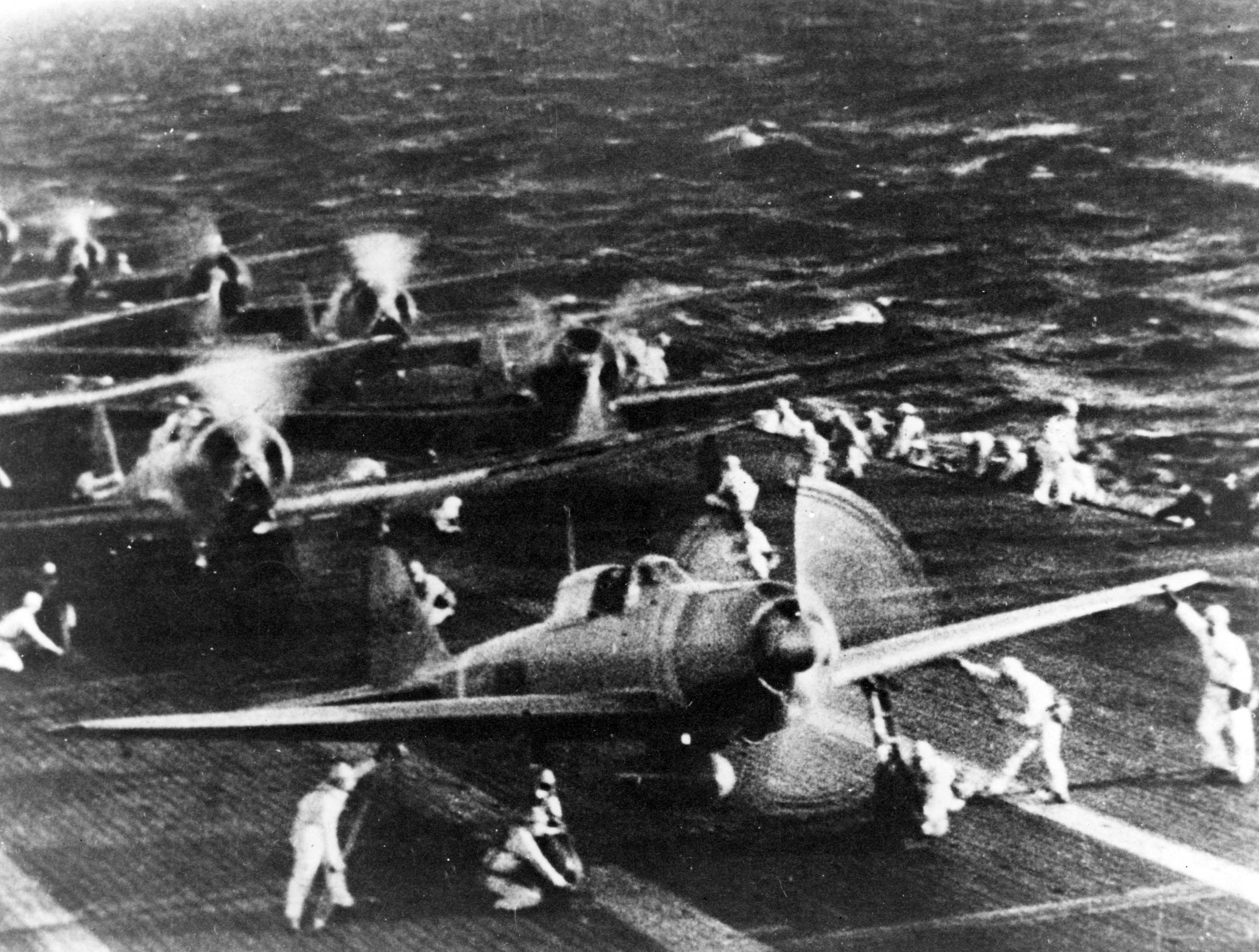
Japanese naval aircraft prepare to attack Pearl Harbor

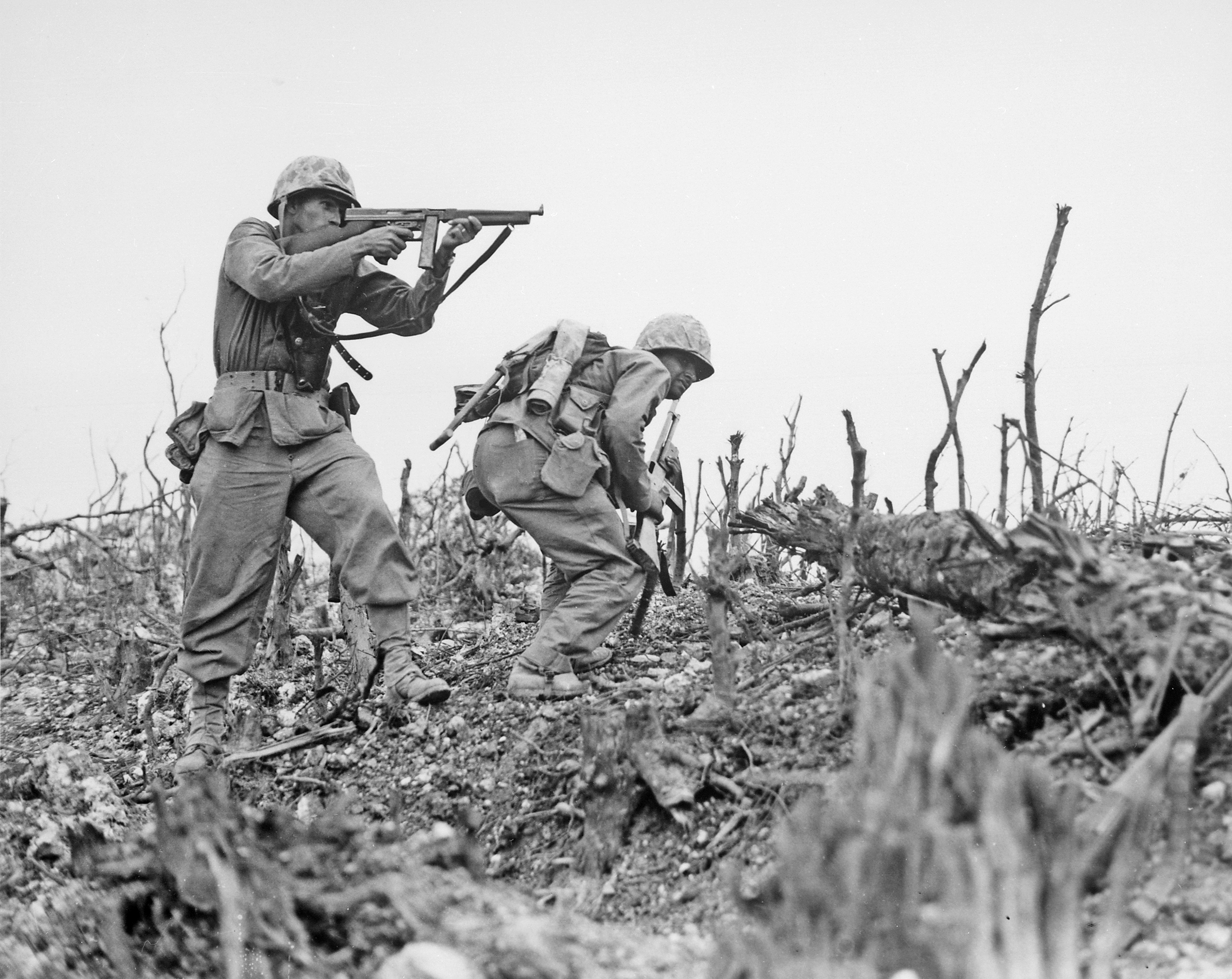
Okinawa, 1945. A U.S. Marine aims a Thompson submachine gun at a Japanese sniper, as his companion takes cover

==== North Pacific Area ====
- Aleutian Islands Campaign, 1942–43
  - Battle of the Komandorski Islands, March 1943

==== Central Pacific Area ====
- Attack on Pearl Harbor, 7 December 1941
- Battle of Guam, 8–10 December 1941
- Battle of Wake Island, 8–23 December 1941
- Japanese occupation of the Gilbert Islands, 9 December 1941 - August 1945
- Marshalls–Gilberts raids, 1 February 1942
- Doolittle Raid, 18 April 1942
- Japanese occupation of Nauru, 26 August 1942 - September 1945
- Battle of Midway, 4–7 June 1942
- Makin Island raid, 17–18 August 1942
- Gilbert and Marshall Islands campaign, November 1943 – February 1944
  - Battle of Tarawa, 20–23 November 1943
  - Battle of Makin, 20–23 November 1943
  - Battle of Kwajalein, 31 January – 3 February 1944
  - Raid on Truk, 17–18 February 1944
  - Battle of Eniwetok, 17–23 February 1944
- Mariana and Palau Islands campaign, 1944
  - Battle of Saipan, June 1944
  - Battle of the Philippine Sea, June 1944
  - Battle of Guam, July – August 1944
  - Battle of Tinian, July – August 1944
  - Battle of Peleliu, September – November 1944
  - Battle of Angaur, September – October 1944
- Battle of Leyte Gulf, October 1944 (Note: The Battle of Leyte Gulf is listed in both the Central Pacific Area (under Nimitz) and in the South West Pacific Area (under MacArthur). Leyte Gulf is where Nimitz's western thrust across the central Pacific Ocean intersected MacArthur's northern thrust across the western Pacific Ocean. While the Pacific Ocean command structure was convoluted, operations were "designed to sequence the SWPA's operations with POA's forces across the central Pacific. The main purpose of sequencing is to arrange objectives/tasks in such a progression that collectively they lead to the accomplishment of the assigned ultimate objective in the shortest time possible and with the least loss of personnel and materiel." Nimitz provided, but maintained control over, Admiral Halsey's Third Fleet to cover and support Admiral Kinkaid's Seventh Fleet operating under General MacArthur. The result of this imprecise arrangement was the crisis precipitating the Battle off Samar. Halsey was operating under Commander in Chief, Pacific Operating Area's (Nimitz') Operations Plan 8–44.)
  - Battle of the Sibuyan Sea, October 1944 (Note: By US Navy's Third Fleet under Admirals Halsey and Nimitz.)
  - Battle off Cape Engaño, October 1944 (Note: By US Navy's Task Force 38 under Admirals Mitscher and Nimitz.)
- Volcano and Ryukyu Islands campaign, 1945
  - Battle of Iwo Jima, February 1945
  - Battle of Okinawa, April 1945

==== South Pacific Area ====
- Guadalcanal campaign, August 1942 – February 1943
  - Battle of Savo Island, 9 August 1942
  - Battle of the Eastern Solomons, 24–25 August 1942
  - Battle of Cape Esperance, 11–12 October 1942
  - Battle for Henderson Field, 23-26 October 1942
  - Battle of the Santa Cruz Islands, 26 October 1942
  - Naval Battle of Guadalcanal, 12–15 November 1942
  - Battle of Tassafaronga, 30 November 1942
- Solomon Islands Campaign, January 1942 – November 1943
  - New Georgia Campaign, June–August 1943
  - Battle of Kula Gulf, 6 July 1943
  - Battle of Kolombangara, 12–13 July 1943
  - Battle of Vella Gulf, 6–7 August 1943
  - Battle of Vella Lavella, August–October 1943
    - Naval Battle of Vella Lavella: 6/7 October 1943
    - Land Battle of Vella Lavella: 15 August – 9 October 1943
  - Bougainville campaign, November 1943 – August 1945
    - Landings at Cape Torokina (Operation Cherryblossom), 1–3 November 1943
    - Battle of Empress Augusta Bay, 1–2 November 1943
    - Bombing of Rabaul (1943), 2–11 November 1943
    - Battle of Koromokina Lagoon, 7–8 November 1943
    - Battle for Piva Trail, 8–9 November 1943
    - Battle of the Coconut Grove, 13–14 November 1943
    - Battle of Piva Forks, 18–25 November 1943
    - Battle of Cape St. George, 25 November 1943
    - Raid on Koiari, 28–29 November 1943
    - Battle of Hellzapoppin Ridge and Hill 600A, 12–24 December 1943
    - Pacification of Rabaul, 17 December 1943 – 8 August 1945
    - Battle of the Green Islands, 15–20 February 1944
    - Second Battle of Torokina, 8–25 March 1944
    - Battle of Pearl Ridge, 30–31 December 1944
    - Battle of Tsimba Ridge, 17 January – 9 February 1945
    - Battle of Slater's Knoll, 28 March – 6 April 1945
    - Battle of the Hongorai River, 17 April – 22 May 1945
    - Battle of Porton Plantation, 8–10 June 1945
    - Battle of Ratsua, June–August 1945

=== South West Pacific Area ===
- Philippines campaign, 1942
  - Battle of Bataan, 7 January – 9 April 1942
  - Battle of Corregidor, 5-6 May 1942
- Dutch East Indies campaign, 1941–42
  - Battle of Borneo (1941–42), 16 December 1941 – March 1942
  - Battle of Manado, 11–13 January 1942
  - Battle of Tarakan (1942), January 11–12, 1942
  - Battle of Balikpapan (1942), 23–24 January 1942
  - Battle of Ambon, 30 January – 3 February 1942
  - Battle of Palembang, 13–15 February 1942
  - Battle of Makassar Strait, 4 February 1942
  - Battle of Badung Strait, 19–20 February 1942
  - Battle of the Java Sea, 27 February 1942
  - Battle of Sunda Strait, 28 February – 1 March 1942
  - Second Battle of the Java Sea, 1 March 1942
  - Battle of Java (1942), 28 February – 12 March 1942
  - Battle of Timor, 19 February 1942 – 10 February 1943
- New Guinea campaign, 1942–45
  - Battle of Rabaul (1942), 23 January – 9 February 1942
  - Bombing of Rabaul (1942), February and March 1942
  - Invasion of Salamaua–Lae, 8-13 March 1942
  - Battle of the Coral Sea, 4-8 May 1942
  - Kokoda Track campaign, 21 July – 16 November 1942
    - Invasion of Buna-Gona, 21-27 July 1942
    - Battle of Kokoda, 28–29 July 1942 and 8–10 August 1942
    - Battle of Isurava, 26–31 August 1942
    - First Battle of Eora Creek, 31 August 1942 – 5 September 1942
    - Battle of Efogi, 6–9 September 1942
    - Battle of Ioribaiwa, 14–16 September 1942
    - Second Battle of Eora Creek, 11–28 October 1942
    - Battle of Oivi–Gorari, 4–11 November 1942
  - Battle of Milne Bay, 25 August – 7 September 1942
  - Battle of Goodenough Island, 22-27 October 1942
  - Battle of Buna–Gona, 16 November 1942 – 22 January 1943
  - Battle of Wau, 29 January - 4 February 1943
  - Battle of the Bismarck Sea, 2-4 March 1943
  - Landings at Woodlark and Kiriwina (Operation Chronicle), 30 June 1943
  - Salamaua–Lae campaign, April–September 1943
    - Battle of Bobdubi, 22 April 1943 – 19 August 1943
    - Battle of Mubo, 22 April 1943 – 14 July 1943
    - Battle of Lababia Ridge, 20–23 June 1943
    - Landing at Nassau Bay, 30 June - 6 July 1943
    - Battle of Mount Tambu, 16 July 1943 – 18 August 1943
    - Landing at Lae (Operation Postern), 4–16 September 1943
    - Landing at Nadzab (Operation Postern), 5 September 1943
  - Huon Peninsula campaign, September 1943 – March 1944
    - Landing at Scarlet Beach (Operation Diminish), 22 September – 2 October 1943
    - Battle of Finschhafen, 22 September – 24 October 1943
    - Battle of Sattelberg, 17–25 November 1943
    - Battle of Wareo, 27 November – 8 December 1943
    - Battle of Sio, 5 December 1943 – 1 March 1944
    - Landing on Long Island, 26 December 1943
    - Landing at Saidor (Operation Michaelmas), 2 January 1944 – 10 February 1944
  - Finisterre Range campaign, September 1943 – April 1944
    - Battle of Kaiapit, 19–20 September 1943
    - Battle of Dumpu, 22 September – 4 October 1943
    - Battle of The Pimple, 27–28 December 1943
    - Battle of Shaggy Ridge, 19–31 January 1944
    - Battle of Madang, February – April 1944
  - Bougainville campaign, November 1943 – August 1945 (referred to as part of both the New Guinea and the Solomon Islands campaigns)
  - New Britain campaign, December 1943 – August 1945
    - Battle of Arawe, 15 December 1943 – 24 February 1944
    - Battle of Cape Gloucester, 26 December 1943 – 16 January 1944
    - Battle of Talasea, 6 – 9 March 1944
    - Landing at Jacquinot Bay, 4 November 1944
    - Battle of Wide Bay–Open Bay, December 1944 – April 1945
  - Admiralty Islands campaign, 29 February – 18 May 1944
  - Landing on Emirau, 20 - 27 March 1944
  - Western New Guinea campaign, April 1944 – August 1945
    - Invasion of Hollandia and Aitape, 22 April 1944
    - Battle of Lone Tree Hill, 17 May – 2 September 1944
    - Battle of Wakde, 18–21 May 1944
    - Battle of Biak, 27 May 1944
    - Battle of Noemfoor, 2 July - August 31 1944
    - Battle of Driniumor River, 10 July – 25 August 1944
    - Battle of Sansapor, 30 July – 31 August 1944
    - Battle of Morotai 15 September 1944
    - Aitape–Wewak campaign, November 1944 – August 1945
- Philippines campaign, 1944-45
  - Battle of Leyte, October–December 1944
  - Battle of Leyte Gulf, October 1944
    - Battle of Palawan Passage, October 1944
    - Battle of Surigao Strait, October 1944
    - Battle off Samar, October 1944
  - Battle of Mindoro, December 1944
  - Battle of Lingayen Gulf, January 1945
  - Battle of Luzon, January–August 1945
  - Battle of Manila, February–March 1945
  - Battle of Corregidor, February 1945
  - Invasion of Palawan, February–April 1945
  - Battle of the Visayas, March–July 1945
  - Battle of Mindanao, March–August 1945
  - Battle of Maguindanao, January–September 1945
- Borneo campaign, 1945
  - Battle of Tarakan, May–June 1945
  - Battle of North Borneo, June–August 1945
  - Battle of Balikpapan, July 1945

=== China-Burma-India Theater ===
- Burma, December 1942 – May 1942
- India-Burma, April 1942 – January 1945
- China Defensive, July 1942 – May 1945
- Central Burma, January 1945 – July 1945
- China Offensive, May 1945 – September 1945
