= Battle of Shaggy Ridge =

1944 WWII battle in Papua New Guinea

- Part of World War II, Pacific War
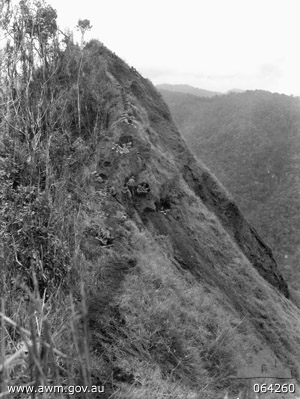
- Members of the 2/9th Infantry Battalion digging in on "Green Sniper's Pimple"
Date	19–31 January 1944
Location	Finisterre Range, Territory of New Guinea
Result	Allied victory

Belligerents
Australia	Japan

Commanders and leaders
(Australia) Alan Vasey	(Empire of Japan) Masutaro Nakai

Units involved
7th Division: 15th Brigade; 18th Brigade; 21st Brigade	Nakai Detachment: 78th Infantry Regiment

Casualties and losses
46 killed 147 wounded	~ 500 killed

The Battle of the Shaggy Ridge was part of the Finisterre Range campaign, consisting of a number of actions fought by Australian and Japanese troops in Papua New Guinea in World War II. Following the Allied capture of Lae and Nadzab, the Australian 9th Division had been committed to a quick follow up action on the Huon Peninsula in an effort to cut off the withdrawing Japanese. Once the situation on the Huon Peninsula stabilised in late 1943, the 7th Division had pushed into the Markham and Ramu Valleys towards the Finisterre Range with a view to pushing north towards the coast around Bogadjim, where they would meet up with Allied forces advancing around the coast from the Huon Peninsula, before advancing towards Madang.

A series of minor engagements followed in the foothills of the Finisterre Range before the Australians came up against strong resistance centred around the Kankiryo Saddle and Shaggy Ridge, which consisted of several steep features, dotted with heavily defended rocky outcrops. After a preliminary assault on a forward position dubbed The Pimple in late December 1943, the Australians renewed their assault in mid-January 1944 and over the course of a fortnight eventually captured the Japanese positions on Shaggy Ridge and the Kankiryo Saddle, after launching a brigade-sized attack up three avenues of advance. In the aftermath, the Australians pursued the Japanese to the coast and subsequently took Madang, linking up with US and Australian forces.

== Prelude ==
=== Strategic situation ===
By late 1943 and early 1944, Australian and US forces had begun offensive actions in New Guinea, having stemmed the tide of the Japanese advance during the fighting in 1942. In September 1943, the Allies had secured Lae and Nadzab with simultaneous advances from the 7th and 9th Divisions. Shortly afterwards, the 9th Division had landed on the Huon Peninsula and had subsequently secured Finschhafen and began clearing inland. By October 1943, the next objective for the Australians was Shaggy Ridge, a series of high positions on the inland route from Dumpu to Madang, which was held by Japanese infantry, supported by artillery and engineers. As part of this advance the 7th Division set out through the Ramu Valley into the Finisterre Range, during which a series of minor engagements were fought, including those around John's Knoll and Trevor's Knoll, as the Japanese withdrew to their main defensive line, which was centred around the Kankiryo Saddle and Shaggy Ridge.

Shaggy Ridge was a 6.5-kilometre (4.0 mi) long spur dotted by several rocky outcrops, which the Australians dubbed "Green Pinnacle", "The Pimple", "Green Sniper's Pimple" and "McCaughey's Knoll". To the north and north-west of Shaggy Ridge, two high features were identified as "Prothero I" and "Prothero II", while the Kankiryo Saddle to the north-east joined Faria Ridge and divided the Faria River from the Mindjim River. The Japanese had established numerous strong posts and positions along the ridge, blocking the Australian advance towards the coast, where they were aiming to secure Bogadjim and Madang. The ridge dominated the area around it, standing at 1,700 metres (5,600 ft), and in clear weather offered observation as far north as Madang, although largely the area was covered in thick fog which greatly reduced visibility. The sheer nature of the terrain meant that there was only a single track along the ridge line which was, and according to author Lachlan Grant, "in places...only wide enough for one man to pass with sheer drops on either side".

=== Opposing forces ===
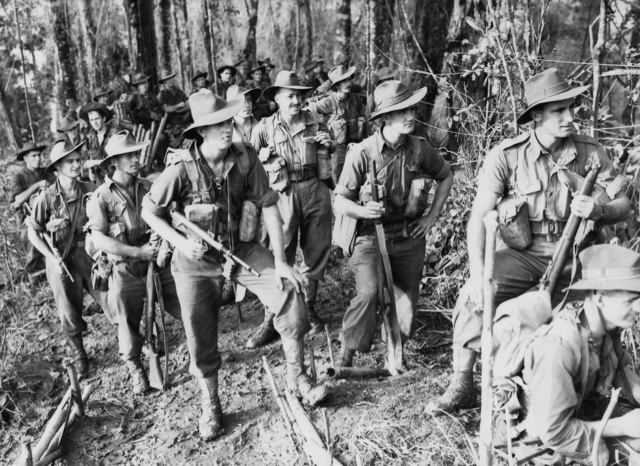
Troops of the 2/16th Australian Infantry Battalion, watch aircraft bombarding The Pimple prior to their attack on Japanese positions there, 27 December 1943.

The area was defended by elements of the Imperial Japanese Army's 78th Infantry Regiment, supported by the 26th Artillery Regiment and the 27th Independent Engineer Regiment, which formed part of a detachment under the command of Major General Masutaro Nakai, who was subordinated to the 18th Army. These units were roughly at half strength, although Australian intelligence estimates put the number of troops around Kankiryo and Shaggy Ridge at around 3,000.

Against this, the Australian forces were drawn from the 7th Division, which due to limited resources only pushed two brigades forward at any one time; initially these were the 21st and 25th Brigades, although they were later replaced by the 15th and 18th Brigades. These forces would subsequently rotate throughout the fighting. With the exception of the 15th Brigade, which was a Militia formation, these were all Second Australian Imperial Force units. These elements were supported by artillery from the 2/4th Field Regiment, equipped with eleven Ordnance QF 25-pounders and 7,000 rounds, and aircraft from the Royal Australian Air Force and United States Army Air Force.

=== Assault on the Pimple ===
In late December 1943, the Australian offensive to take Shaggy Ridge began, focused on an attack on The Pimple. The Pimple was one of three rocky outcrops, held by the Japanese on the ridge line. The 2/16th Battalion of the Australian 21st Brigade had been reinforced with hundreds of new troops, after earlier losses. It proceeded up the southern slopes towards The Pimple, with air support. The area was bombarded with a preparatory artillery and aerial barrage. The attack was successful, driving the Japanese off the position on 27–28 December 1943. Australian troops held it against further counter-attacks, and further attacks were followed up against the other positions. This allowed the Australians to gain a foothold on the position, and in the process they gained a position that had been holding them up for the past two months; nevertheless, the Japanese continued to hold Shaggy Ridge in strength.

== Battle ==
In early January 1944, the Australian effort to gain the position was renewed as two fresh brigades – the 15th and 18th – arrived to relieve the 21st and 25th Brigades. They subsequently launched Operation Cutthroat, aimed at securing the Kankiryo Saddle at the northern end of Shaggy Ridge, joining Faria Ridge, Shaggy Ridge, and the two Protheroe features. Brigadier Frederick Chilton's 18th Brigade was chosen for the attack; Chilton's force consisted of three infantry battalions – the 2/9th, 2/10th and 2/12th – and was supported by the 2/2nd Pioneer Battalion. Supplies were subsequently brought forward by jeep to a position dubbed "Guy's Post", in order to shorten the lines of communication, and artillery was also brought forward from the 2/4th Field Regiment.

A series of actions then followed as the Australians assaulted the position from three points, carrying out the operation in four phases. On the right of the assault, early on 20 January, the 2/10th began its advance up Sprogg's Spur, to the east of Shaggy Ridge, in the first phase, pushing towards Cam's Saddle, which ran south-west towards Faria Ridge; they were supported by air strikes along the ridges from the Protheros to Shaggy Ridge. A brief engagement occurred around mid morning, which was defeated by a short artillery barrage and then an infantry assault. The 2/10th was subsequently able to gain Cam's Saddle and by nightfall had dug-in and was postured towards the west, ready for a further effort along the Faria Ridge. Elsewhere, around Geyton's Hill, as, on the left of the assault, a patrol from the 2/2nd Pioneers crossed over the Mene River on 19 January and reconnoitred ahead of the 2/12th through Prothero I to Kankiryo. Finding only light resistance there, they nearly secured the position themselves.

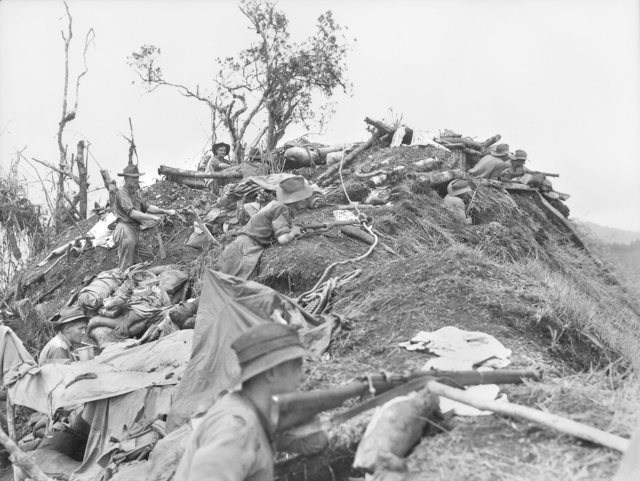
Members of 'C' Company, Australian 2/9th Battalion, digging in at a newly occupied part of Shaggy Ridge on 23 January 1944

The 2/12th struggled over the river amidst heavy rain, and then established themselves on Canning's Saddle, the following day they attacked Prothero I. Advancing silently up the steep slopes, they were able to surprise the Japanese defenders, creeping to within 100 yards (91 m) of the objective before they were noticed by the Japanese defenders, at which point the Australians charged the position. Heavy fighting followed with units to the flanks; however, by night fall on 21 January, the 2/12th had secured Prothero I, silencing a Japanese mountain gun which had fired at them at point blank range from the back door of a bunker, causing 50 casualties, including the battalion commander, Lieutenant Colonel Charles Bourne. Later, they repelled a Japanese attempt to retake the position during the night. The plan then called for the 2/12th to push south-east along Shaggy Ridge to the Kankiryo Saddle. Elsewhere, the 2/9th took the central position, attacking north-west up Shaggy Ridge securing positions at Green Sniper's Pimple on the southern part of McCaughey's Knoll, with a frontal attack, as part of the first phase in their advance through to the Kankiryo Saddle.

On 22 January, Japanese artillery began firing on the 2/12th's position, but it was unable to prevent them from taking Prothero II. Meanwhile, a small patrol from the 2/2nd Pioneers began exploiting the area to the north-east of Prothero II and subsequently managed to install itself in a position on the eastern extremity of Kankiryo Saddle. To the south, the 2/9th carried out reconnaissance around the area in front of their position around Green Sniper's Pimple, and located several Japanese bunkers. Deciding on an indirect approach, an Australian patrol was sent to the flanks and under the cover of heavy artillery, they scaled the steep sides of McCaughey's Knoll to take the position with the element of surprise. Earlier, the 2/10th had taken several attempts to secure Cam's Hill, including an unsuccessful assault on the Japanese rear with a flanking move through the Faria River. Throughout the night, the Japanese launched several unsuccessful counter-attack attempts, but these were repelled and on 24 January, the 2/9th and 2/12th Infantry Battalions continued to converge, squeezing the Japanese defenders between them. As a result, the Japanese were forced to abandon positions around the top of the Faria River and the Kankiryo Saddle and they began to withdraw to Crater Hill. The following day, patrols from the 2/10th and 2/12th Infantry Battalions determined that the Japanese were digging in on that position, and throughout the day the 2/9th attempted to outflank the position, attacking from behind while the 2/10th and 2/12th assaulted frontally from the south. These proved unsuccessful and during 26 January, the 2/9th sent two companies across Kankiryo Saddle, securing the 4100 feature before coming under heavy fire from the Japanese on Crater Hill, where they had dug-in strong defences along several sharp ridges.

== Aftermath ==
Following the capture of the Kankiryo Saddle on 26 January, the remnants of the Japanese defenders withdrew to Crater Hill, to the north-east of the previously abandoned position. The 4100 feature was taken without opposition that day by the 2/9th, but Crater Hill remained in Japanese possession, its forbidding approaches, hampering efforts to clear it. Instead of risking heavy casualties in a hurried follow-up attack, Chilton chose to slowly attrite the Japanese position with indirect fire and aerial attacks over the course of four days. On 29 January, the 2/9th and 2/10th commenced their attack, having surrounded the position from three sides. Due to inaccurate maps, several artillery salvos fell on the advancing Australians, wounding several officers, including a couple of British Army officers that had been attached to the Australian battalions on exchange. Over the course of the next couple of days the Australians kept up the pressure on the Japanese defenders with fighting patrols, and small scale assaults to reduce Japanese positions around the feature. Finally, on 1 February 1944, the 2/9th made it to the crest of the hill, and subsequently found that the Japanese had disinvested themselves from the position, having fallen back to Paipa. Following its occupation, Crater Hill was surveyed by the Australians and they found that there were over 40 foxholes or pillboxes inside the position across a frontage of 500 yards (460 m) to a depth of 60 yards (55 m); in addition there were 110 strong points on the ridges leading to it.

Throughout the first week of February, the Australian units were redeployed to new positions: the 2/10th around the 4100 feature across the Kankiryo Saddle and stretching to Crater Hill; the 2/9th from Shaggy Ridge to the Protheros and the 2/12th from Lake Hill to McCullough's Ridge. In the following days patrols were sent out and exploited the surrounding areas, pushing towards Paipa, clearing up isolated pockets of Japanese as they went. Casualties during the fighting to secure Shaggy Ridge amounted to up to 500 Japanese killed, and 46 killed and 147 wounded for the Australians. In the aftermath, the Australians undertook a brief operational pause, as supplies were brought up and troops were rotated – the 15th Brigade relieved the 18th – before the Australians advanced towards Bogadjim, pursuing the Japanese forces as they withdrew. After effecting a link up with US forces advancing west from Saidor, which had been secured in February 1944 as part of the Huon Peninsula campaign, the Australians eventually secured Madang in April 1944.
