= 2/16th Battalion (Australia) =

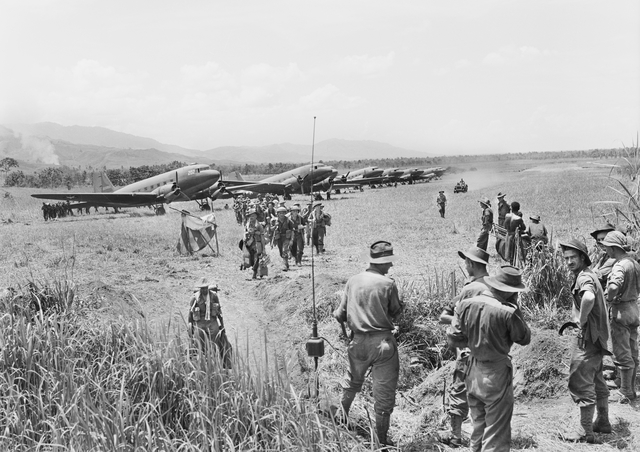
- Troops from the 2/16th fly in to Kaiapit, September 1943
- Active: April 1940 – February 1946
- Country: Australia
- Branch: Australian Army
- Type: Infantry
- Size: ~ 800–900 personnel all ranks
- Part of: 21st Brigade, 7th Division
- Colours: White over blue
- Engagements: World War II: Syria–Lebanon campaign; New Guinea campaign

Insignia
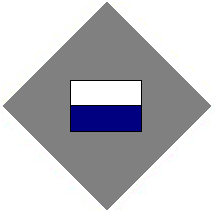
- Unit colour patch

The 2/16th Battalion was an infantry battalion of the Australian Army, serving during World War II. Attached to the 21st Brigade that was assigned to the 7th Division, the 2/16th was raised in 1940 as part of the Second Australian Imperial Force from volunteers drawn mainly from the state of Western Australia. After training in Australia, the battalion was deployed to the Middle East where it undertook defensive duties along the Egyptian–Libyan border in early 1941 before taking part in the Syria–Lebanon campaign, fighting against Vichy French forces in June and July. At the conclusion of the campaign, the 2/16th remained in Lebanon, contributing to the Allied occupation force there, before returning to Australia in early 1942 following Japan's entry into the war. In August 1942, they were committed to the fighting along the Kokoda Track and then later fought around Buna and Gona. After a period of rest and reorganisation in Australia, the battalion fought around Lae and then took part in the Finisterre Range campaign in 1943–44. Its final campaign of the war came in Borneo in July 1945. At the end of the war, the 2/16th were disbanded in January 1946.

== History ==
=== Formation and service in the Middle East ===
The 2/16th Battalion was recruited in Perth, in the state of Western Australia in early 1940, with its first war diary entry being made on 20 April 1940. Raised from volunteers from the Second Australian Imperial Force (2nd AIF), which was established for overseas service at the start of the war, many of the battalion's early recruits were from the goldfields of Western Australia. After the concentration and training of the battalion's initial cadre in Perth, the battalion was moved to Northam where on 30 April the first draft of recruits arrived and the process of forming the battalion's subunits began. With an authorised strength of around 900 personnel, like other Australian infantry battalions of the time, the battalion was formed around a nucleus of four rifle companies – designated 'A' through to 'D' – each consisting of three platoons.

The unit conducted its own basic training, which was only partially completed prior to its embarkation for Egypt in October 1940. The battalion's first commanding officer was Lieutenant Colonel Alfred Baxter-Cox, and, along with the 2/14th and 2/27th Battalions, it was assigned to the 21st Brigade, which formed part of the 7th Division. The colours chosen for the battalion's unit colour patch (UCP) were the same as those of the 16th Battalion, a unit which had served during World War I before being raised as a Militia formation in 1921. These colours were white over dark blue, in a horizontal rectangular shape, although a border of gray in the shape of a diamond was added to the UCP to distinguish the battalion from its Militia counterpart.

Sailing via India, the 21st Brigade briefly landed at Bombay and constituted for the first time at Deolali, before continuing on to the Middle East. After their arrival in Egypt in late November 1940, the 2/16th moved to Palestine where it continued its training. In February 1941, the 2/16th received a new commanding officer, Lieutenant Colonel Alex Bath MacDonald, a Permanent Military Force member. Shortly after this, the battalion was allocated to defend the Egypt–Libya border against a possible German attack, and occupied defensive positions.

=== Syria-Lebanon Campaign ===
In April 1941, the battalion was transported back to Palestine to take part in Operation Exporter, which was the Allied codename for the Syria-Lebanon Campaign. Commencing in early June 1941, the battalion began offensive actions against Vichy French troops and over the course of the next six weeks fought major actions at the Litani River, Sidon and Damour. The 2/16th Battalion suffered heavily during the campaign, having 264 casualties; according to the Australian War Memorial, this was the most of any Australian unit that took part in the campaign. In August, Lieutenant Colonel Arnold Potts took over command of the battalion. The unit remained in the Middle East until January 1942, being stationed in Lebanon and forming part of the Allied occupation force that was established following the armistice in mid-July 1941.

=== New Guinea Campaigns ===
By early 1942, the Japanese had entered the war, and the Australian government decided to bring some of its troops from the Middle East back to Australia to bolster its defences. The 2/16th embarked at the end of January 1942, and returned to Australia, landing at Adelaide in March 1942 after a brief stopover in Fremantle. A period of reorganisation followed as they were prepared for the hardships of jungle warfare, during which time Potts handed over command of the battalion to Lieutenant Colonel Albert Caro; however, the situation in the Pacific at the time was desperate for the Australians, following Japanese victories in Malaya, Singapore, Rabaul and Ambon, and fighting on the Kokoda Track, and so the 2nd AIF troops returning from the Middle East had very little time to prepare for their next campaign. The 2/16th arrived in New Guinea, landing in Port Moresby in mid-August 1942. Later that month it was committed to the battle, and joined the fighting retreat down the Kokoda Track, being rushed into the line around Alola to fill a gap after the 53rd Battalion fell back from Isurava. At the Battle of Mission Ridge in early September it suffered heavy casualties after being encircled by the Japanese and conducting a fighting withdrawal to Imita Ridge. Following its relief in the middle of September, the battalion's surviving members were joined with those from the 2/14th Battalion to form a composite unit temporarily, as the battalion suffered so many casualties in the retreat that it was down to an effective strength of about 200 men; the 2/14th had also suffered heavily.

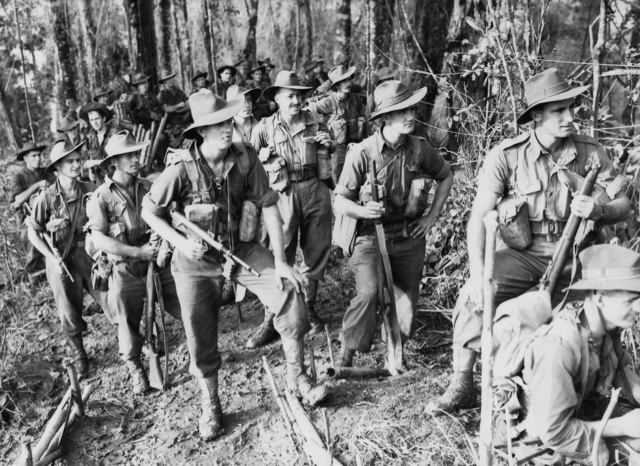
Troops of the 2/16th Infantry Battalion watch aircraft bombing Japanese positions prior to their attack on "The Pimple", Shaggy Ridge, New Guinea.

As the tide of the campaign along the Kokoda Track turned towards the Australians, the Japanese withdrew north towards their beachheads around Buna and Gona, with the Australians in pursuit. A brief period of rest and reorganisation followed for the 2/16th during this time, as they were re-constituted before being committed to the Battle of Buna–Gona in November 1942. Despite the arrival of reinforcements, the battalion could only provide two or its four rifle companies to the fighting, and by early January it was withdrawn, with a strength of only 56 men.

The battalion was subsequently rebuilt on the Atherton Tablelands. During this time, the battalion received over 600 reinforcements from the 16th Motor Regiment; it also received a new commanding officer in Lieutenant Colonel Frank Sublet, who would subsequently command the battalion for the remainder of the war. In August 1943, the battalion deployed to New Guinea again for its second campaign against the Japanese. Staging out of Port Moresby, in early September the 7th Division was flown into Nadzab, and the 2/16th supported operations to capture Lae. After this, it was air transported to Kaiapit, where from late September it took part in the advance up the Markham Valley towards Dumpu. As the division pushed through the Ramu Valley and then moved into the Finisterre Range, the 2/16th undertook a series of patrols and advances, but experienced only minor actions. These culminated in a significant action around Shaggy Ridge on 27–28 December, when it conducted an assault on a position dubbed "The Pimple". In January 1944, at the conclusion of the campaign, the battalion was withdrawn to Port Moresby, and returned to Australia in late March.

=== Borneo and disbandment ===
After returning to Australia, the battalion spent over a year training for its final campaign – the Borneo campaign – which came in the final months of the war. After staging out of Morotai Island, on 1 July the battalion took part in the amphibious landing at Balikpapan. Its most significant actions of the Borneo campaign were fought on the first day of this operation, as the 21st Brigade landed on Green Beach, on the right of the lodgement and then advanced east along the coast, tasked with capturing Sepinggang and the airfield at Manggar. Nevertheless, after the initial fighting the battalion continued aggressive patrolling until the end of hostilities in mid-August 1945. Following the war's end the 2/16th Battalion occupied the Celebes before being repatriated to Australia for demobilisation in early 1946. The 2/16th Battalion was disbanded in February 1946 while camped in Brisbane, Queensland.

Throughout its service a total of 3,275 men served with the battalion which suffered 671 casualties, of which 223 were killed or died from wounds, accident or disease. Members of the battalion received the following decorations: three Distinguished Service Orders, six Military Crosses with two Bars, five Distinguished Conduct Medals, 20 Military Medals with one Bar and 63 Mentions in Despatches; in addition, one member of the battalion was appointed as a Member of the Order of the British Empire.

== Battle honours ==
The 2/16th Battalion received 21 battle and theatre honours:

- North Africa, Syria 1941, Syrian Frontier, The Litani, Wadi Zeini, Damour, South-West Pacific 1942–1945, Kokoda Trail, Isurava, Eora Creek–Templeton's Crossing I, Efogi–Menari, Ioribaiwa, Buna–Gona, Gona, Amboga River, Lae–Nadzab, Liberation of Australian New Guinea, Ramu Valley, Shaggy Ridge, Borneo 1945, Balikpapan.

These honours were subsequently entrusted to the 16th Battalion in 1961, and through this link are maintained by the Royal Western Australia Regiment. These honours are carried on by the 16th Battalion, Royal Western Australia Regiment.

== Commanding officers ==
The following officers served as commanding officer of the 2/16th Battalion:

- Lieutenant Colonel Alfred Richard Baxter-Cox (1940–41)
- Lieutenant Colonel Alex Bath MacDonald (1941)
- Lieutenant Colonel Arnold Potts (1941–42)
- Lieutenant Colonel Albert Edward Caro (1942)
- Lieutenant Colonel Frank Henry Sublet (1943–45).
