= 2/2nd Pioneer Battalion =

- Active: 1940–1945
- Country: Australia
- Branch: Army
- Role: Pioneer
- Part of: 7th Division
- Engagements: World War II: Syria–Lebanon Campaign; Battle of Java (1942); Salamaua–Lae campaign; Finisterre Range campaign; Borneo campaign

Insignia
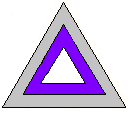
- Unit colour patch

The 2/2nd Pioneer Battalion was one of four pioneer battalions raised as part of the Second Australian Imperial Force during World War II. Raised in 1940, the battalion served in the Middle East during the Syria–Lebanon Campaign against the Vichy French in mid-1941, fighting mainly as infantry. In 1942, the battalion was committed to the defence of Java, fighting against the Japanese and was all but destroyed following the capitulation of the defending garrison. Rebuilt in 1943, it later took part in the Salamaua–Lae and Finisterre Range campaigns in 1943–44 and the Borneo campaign in 1945 before being disbanded.

== History ==
Formed in May 1940 at Puckapunyal, Victoria, under the command of Lieutenant Colonel Nelson Wellington, the battalion was one of four pioneer battalions raised as part of the Second Australian Imperial Force during World War II. The concept of pioneer battalions had originally been explored by the Australians during World War I, when five such battalions were formed and utilised as support troops assigned at divisional level on the Western Front. Notionally organised along a traditional infantry structure, pioneer battalions consisted of a headquarters and four companies, and were expected to serve to undertake minor engineering tasks during combat in order to free up trained engineers for more complex tasks. Within the divisional structure, the pioneers were administered as corps troops under the direction of the divisional engineer commander.

After completing initial training, the 2/2nd Pioneers embarked upon the Queen Mary in April 1941 and sailed for the Middle East. After arriving in Egypt in May, the battalion eventually served in Syria and Palestine, assigned to the 7th Division, fighting against the Vichy French during the Syria–Lebanon Campaign, where they fought mainly as infantry. The battalion had not been fully trained in this role and had not received all the equipment required, lacking mortars and possessing only a small number of automatic weapons, and lacking some of the specialist troops of established infantry battalions, including an intelligence section. Nevertheless, it was committed to several attacks, including a two company frontal assault on Fort Merdjayoun on 17 June, which resulted in heavy casualties with 27 killed, 46 wounded, and 29 being taken prisoner. Further actions followed around Merdjayoun, El Mtolle and Damour before the Vichy French defenders capitulated in July. Casualties throughout the whole campaign amounted to 14 officers and 161 other ranks killed or wounded.

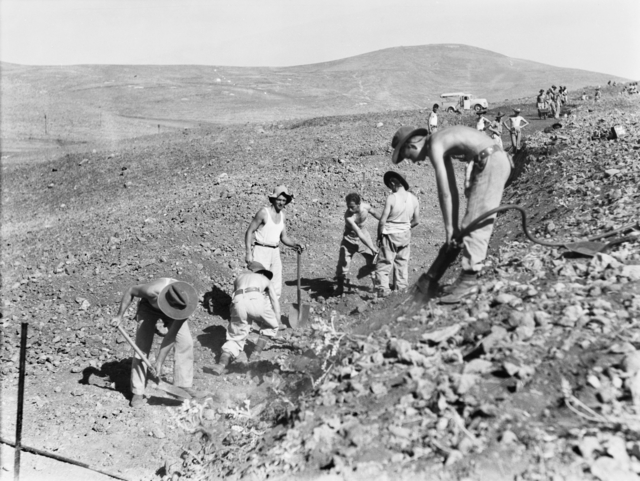
Pioneers from the 2/2nd digging-in, Syria, November 1941.

Following the completion of the fighting in Syria, the 2/2nd Pioneers undertook training and garrison duties moving between several locations including Damour, Tripoli, Fort Legout, and then Qatana. In 1942, following Japan's entry into the war, the 2/2nd was ordered to return to Australia, embarking upon the troopship Orcades. En route, they were diverted, however, along with other elements of the 7th Division to defend Java against the Japanese, landing there in late February 1942 and joining "Blackforce" under the command of Brigadier Arthur Blackburn. There, during the Netherlands East Indies campaign, the 2/2nd Pioneers took part in a brief, but bitter engagement before being ordered to surrender; a large number of the 2/2nd's personnel were captured – over 800 men – of whom 258 later died in captivity. Dispatched across south-east Asia, the men were used as forced labour on the Burma–Thailand railway, and in camps on Java and Borneo.

A small number of personnel who had been in the battalion's rear detail, managed to avoid capture having been routed separately from the Middle East. Returning to Australia, initially they were to be redistributed to other units, but eventually the decision was made to reform the 2/2nd and throughout the remainder of 1942 and into 1943 the battalion was rebuilt from this cadre. In June 1943, the 2/2nd Pioneers were deployed to New Guinea undertaking both traditional infantry and engineering tasks. Assigned once again to the 7th Division, they saw combat in the Markham–Ramu Valley, advancing overland from Tsili Tsili, and constructing an airfield after the Landing at Nadzab. They were then re-roled as infantry and joined the drive on Lae alongside Australian and US forces. They remained in New Guinea, taking part in the advance into the Finisterres, including the fighting around Shaggy Ridge, until early 1944 when they returned to Australia for rest and reorganisation.

The battalion's final involvement in the war came in mid-1945 when it deployed to support both the 7th and 9th Divisions in Operation Oboe as part of the 2nd Beach Group. In this role they participated in both the Battle of Tarakan and the Battle of Balikpapan during the Borneo campaign. During this campaign, the battalion was used primarily as a labour force around the beachhead, unloading stores and equipment, maintaining defensive positions and guarding prisoners. Following the end of hostilities in August 1945, the battalion was disbanded in late 1945. The 2/2nd's casualties during the war amounted to 394 killed in action or died on active service, and 121 wounded. Members of the battalion received the following decorations: two Distinguished Service Orders, five Officers of the Order of the British Empire, two Military Crosses, two British Empire Medals, 13 Military Medals and 13 Mentions in Despatches.

After the war, the functions of the pioneers were subsumed into traditional infantry battalions, which each raised a platoon of assault pioneers within their support companies. As a result, no pioneer battalions have been re-raised in the Australian Army since the end of World War II.

== Battle honours ==
For the service during World War II, the 2/2nd Pioneer Battalion was awarded the following battle honours:

- Syria 1941, Merjayun, Damour, Mazaraat ech Chouf, South-West Pacific 1942–1945, Lae–Nadzab, Lae Road, Liberation of Australian New Guinea, Ramu Valley, Shaggy Ridge, Java 1942.
