= Jungle Patrol (1944 film) =

- Directed by: Tom Gurr
- Written by: Tom Gurr
- Produced by: Jack S. Allan
- Narrated by: Peter Finch
- Cinematography: Bill Trerise; William Carty
- Edited by: Frank Coffey
- Production company: Commonwealth Film Unit
- Distributed by: British Empire Films
- Release date: 1944
- Running time: 19 minutes
- Country: Australia
- Language: English
- Budget: £480

Jungle Patrol is a 1944 Australian documentary narrated by Peter Finch, and directed by Tom Gurr. The film follows eight Australian soldiers on a fighting patrol in New Guinea during World War II.

== Plot ==
The film starts with the introduction of all 8 members of the infantry section which the film follows. From Port Moresby, the section board a USAF C47 called the Honeymoon Express, then covers their flight over the Owen Stanley Range and Kokoda Trail, with the narrator noting the heavy fighting that took place in the recapture of Kokoda in 1942. The plane land at an airstrip at Dumpu in the Ramu Valley, ten miles from the frontline.

The eight troops them march through the Ramu Valley, fording the Ramu river and then bathing in a pool. The section then pushes on through tough terrain in tropical heat, beginning their ascent of the Finisterre Range, encountering local inhabitants in service with the Australian army as porters and stretcher bearers. When the section arrive at their battalion's position on Shaggy Ridge, the men pitch tent, eat and apply products such as anti-lice lotion and foot powder.

The next day, the men shave, cut their hair and drink treated water, before embarking on a long range patrol into the jungle. Along the way, they radio back to headquarters, and receive airdropped food from a USAAF C-47. Later on their patrol, the men take fire from a Japanese sniper, and are then shot at by a Japanese machine gun hidden in the jungle. The section closes in on the enemy, firing at them with their small arms, before taking out the bunker with hand grenades. The Australians then bury the Japanese soldiers that they killed.

Viewers next see the beginning of the Battle for Shaggy Ridge. They see a forward artillery observer up a tree, followed by a bombardment by Australian QF 25-pounder howitzers, as well as machine guns and mortars. Artillery bursts on the ridge, and then USAAF P-40 fighter bombers strafe and bomb the ridge. Australian troops are later seen in possession of the ridge, with victory signalled by a flare being fired and a victory roll from a P-40 fighter.

The film closes with shots from a USAAF B-17. Shots show Australian infantrymen struggling up a trail, fighting against Japanese troops, then soldiers heroically framed on a mountain top. The commentary concludes "You, the Australian soldier, have sweated some more miles of jungle. You have won another battle. In a year, you've advanced three hundred miles. You've got three thousand miles to go. But when the Allies march into Tokyo, you'll be marching in - with them!"

== Cast ==
- Private A N McGregor
- Corporal A C Pierson
- Private F C Northcott
- Private A B Graffin
- Private M J Driver
- Corporal R A Box
- Private J H Adams
- Private E Barmby

== Depiction of local people ==
New Guinea natives in Australian service are depicted helping carry supplies for Australian soldiers and are referred to as "boongs", with narrator Peter Finch claiming, "You couldn't fight the war without the boong, the steady, patient boong".

== Production ==
The film was made by the Australian government to demonstrate the contribution of Australia to the New Guinea campaign, which they felt had not received sufficient acknowledgement. It was shot over five weeks and was widely distributed in Australia and overseas, including in newly liberated European countries. Writer-director Tom Gurr, who worked on the film without pay, estimated it was seen by fifteen million people.

== Reception ==
Filmink thought "The best thing about" the film were "the visuals – soldiers playing harmonica in a plane, having to play cards with hand signs because the engine is too loud, native guides helping get gear off the plane, soldiers helping each other across a creek and having a swim, traipsing the long grass, the little details of patrolling (shaving, adding tablets to water, putting powder on feet), going into battle... [the film] is a remarkable achievement and should be better known."
