= 7th Division (Australia) =

WW2 Australian Army formation

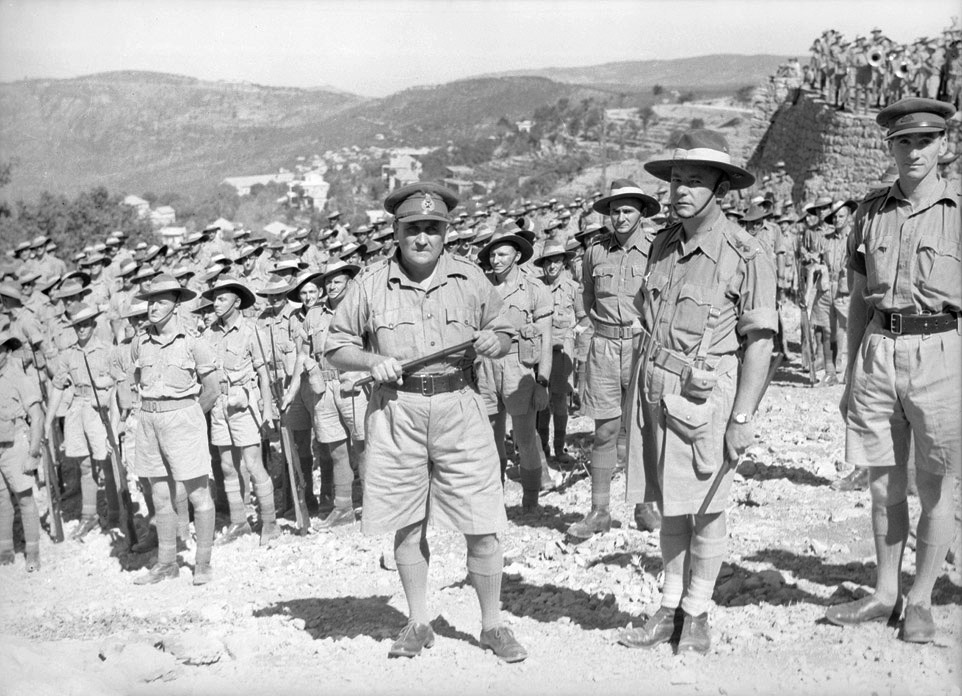
- Hammana, Lebanon. 2 September 1941. Maj. Gen. A. S. "Tubby" Allen (centre), commander of the 7th Division, with Lt Col. Murray Moten (centre right), commander of the 2/27th Infantry Battalion and his men. (Photographer: Frank Hurley.)
- Active: 1940–1946
- Country: Australia
- Branch: Second Australian Imperial Force
- Type: Division
- Role: Infantry
- Size: ~17,000 men
- Part of: I Corps
- Nickname: "The Silent Seventh"
- Engagements: World War II: Siege of Giarabub; Siege of Tobruk; Syria-Lebanon campaign; New Guinea campaign; Borneo campaign

Commanders
- Notable commanders: Arthur "Tubby" Allen; George Alan Vasey

Insignia
- Unit colour patch

The 7th Division was an infantry division of the Australian Army. It was formed in February 1940 to serve in World War II, as part of the Second Australian Imperial Force (2nd AIF). The division was raised on the British establishment of nine infantry battalions per division and consisted of two new brigades and three of the original 12 battalions of the 6th Division forming the third brigade. The division is sometimes known by the nickname "The Silent Seventh", due to a perception that its achievements were unrecognised, in comparison to the other Australian divisions. The origin of this belief appears to be censorship of the part played by the 7th Division in the fierce fighting in the 1941 Syria-Lebanon campaign. The 7th Division along with the 6th and 9th Australian Divisions were the only divisions to serve in both the Middle East and the South West Pacific Area. It was disbanded in 1946, following the end of the war.

== History ==
=== Formation ===
The 7th Division was the second division raised as part of the 2nd AIF following the outbreak of World War II. Approval for the formation of the new division was granted on 28 February 1940 and on 4 April its first commanding officer, Major General John Lavarack, was appointed. Upon formation the division consisted of three infantry brigades: the 19th, 20th and 21st. Of these, the 19th was formed in Palestine and the other two were formed in Australia. In June 1940, however, the 19th Brigade was replaced in the division by the 18th Brigade, which was then based in the United Kingdom where they were undertaking garrison duties to defend against a possible invasion of that country by the Germans following the Fall of France as part of the 6th Division. This was short lived, however, for the following month the division lost the 18th Brigade and gained the 26th Brigade which was still forming in Australia. This enabled the division to undertake training together prior to embarking for the Middle East in October 1940. In February 1941 further changes in the division's composition occurred. The 20th and 26th Brigades were transferred to the 9th Division and in exchange the division received the 18th and 25th Brigades.

=== North Africa and Middle East ===
On arrival in the Middle East the division undertook training in Palestine and Egypt before the 18th Brigade was sent to capture an Italian position at Giarabub. The main assault was undertaken by the 2/9th Battalion on 21 March, although a company from the 2/10th and machine-gunners from the 2/12th provided support. For the loss of 15 killed and 71 wounded, the Australians captured the fortress along with 36 artillery pieces. In April, the 18th Brigade moved from Alexandria to Tobruk, where they later played a successful defensive role in the Siege of Tobruk, from May to August 1941. In the actions around Tobruk, the division suffered 135 killed, 507 wounded and 29 captured.

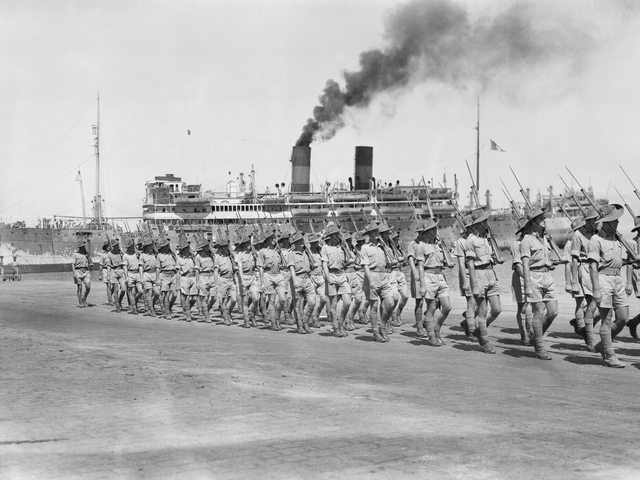
Members of the 2/25th Battalion in Beirut, September 1941

Meanwhile, the rest of the 7th Division formed the backbone of the Allied invasion of Lebanon and Syria; with British, Indian, Free French and Czechoslovak forces defeating Vichy French land forces in the Middle East in June and July. Starting on 8 June, the division advanced along two main axes: the 21st Brigade moving along the coast road from Tyre, crossing the Litani and moving towards Sidon, while the 25th Brigade advanced 31 miles (50 km) to the east from Metula towards Merdajayoun and Jezzine. Both brigades advanced in two columns. The initial phase of the attack came to an end on 15 June when the Vichy French launched a counterattack, striking at Merdjayoun and recapturing it and Fort Khiam. On 21 June, the 2/25th Battalion entered Damascus and Fort Khiam and its adjacent village, were re-occupied by the Australians. By 30 June the Australians had recaptured the initiative and the 7th Division handed over the central sector to the British. Following this, the division concentrated around Jezzine before advancing towards Damour. Once this was captured, the division continued on towards Beirut, which fell on 12 July.

In mid-July an armistice came into effect and the division was employed on garrison duties along the coastal zone, headquartered in Tripoli. The 18th Brigade rejoined the division in September, taking up defensive positions around Aleppo, to defend against a possible invasion by German forces through Turkey.

During the campaign, two 7th Division personnel earned the Victoria Cross. Lieutenant Arthur Roden Cutler, of the 2/5th Field Regiment, received the decoration for his exploits in June at Merdjayoun and in early July in the Damour area where he was seriously wounded. Corporal Jim Gordon, of the 2/31st Battalion, was the second recipient of the campaign. The division's casualties in Syria and Lebanon included 305 killed, 796 wounded and 90 captured.

=== New Guinea ===
In December 1941, as Japanese forces advanced rapidly in Southeast Asia, it was decided that the 6th and 7th Divisions were needed to defend Australia. In early January 1942, the division moved from Syria, where they had been undertaking garrison duties, to Palestine. On 30 January elements of the division embarked upon transport ships, including the USS Mount Vernon (AP-22) at Suez to begin the journey back to Australia as part of Operation Stepsister. Spread across five convoys, the division's return was staggered. At this time, the British government requested that the division be sent to Burma to help stem the tide of the Japanese advance on Rangoon, but the Australian government declined the request.

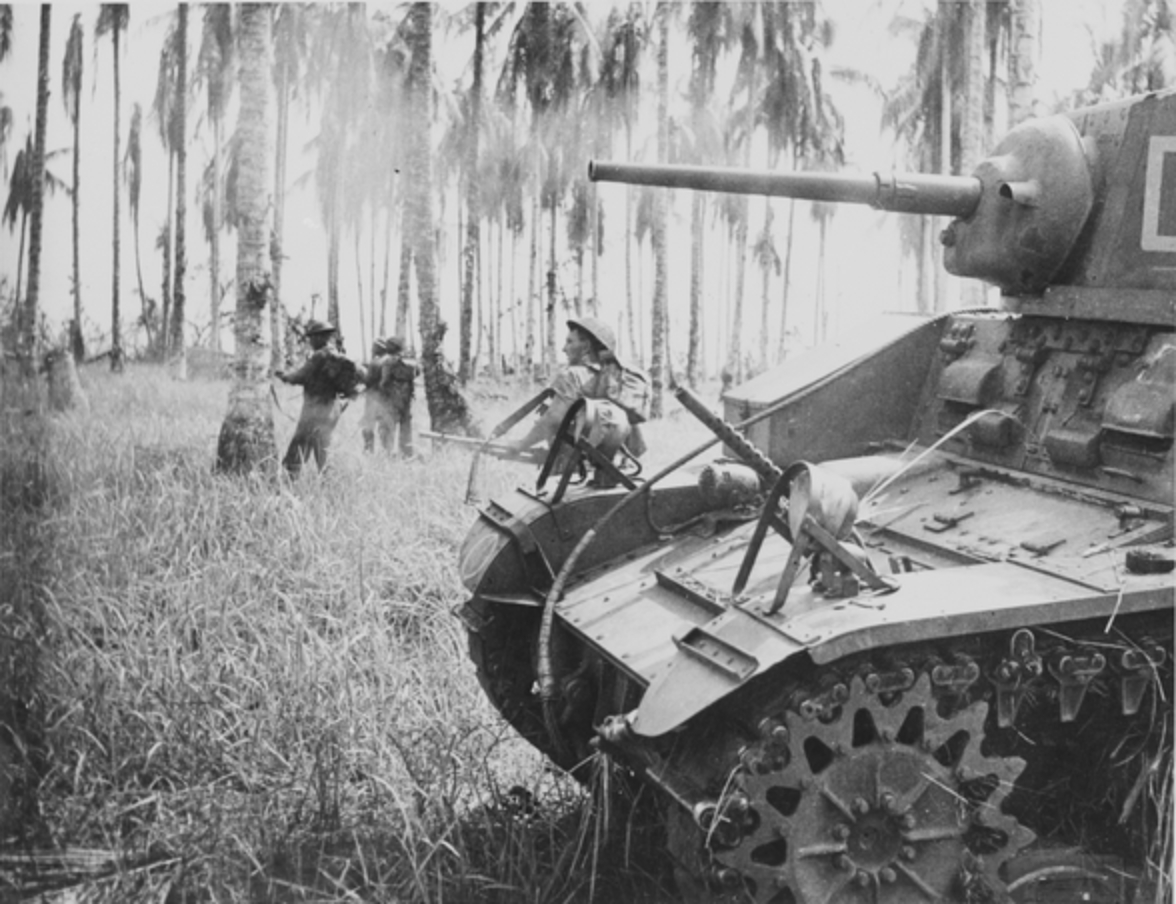
Giropa Point, Papua. Members of the 2/12th Battalion advance as Stuart tanks of the 2/6th Armoured Regiment, shell Japanese pillboxes in the final assault on Buna. An upward-firing machine gun is fitted to the tank, to clear treetops of snipers. (Photographer: George Silk).

Nevertheless, elements of the division, consisting mainly of men from the 2/3rd Machine Gun Battalion, the 2/2nd Pioneer Battalion, and the 2/6th Field Company, as well as some transport and medic personnel, on the transport Orcades were diverted to Java, and fought alongside Dutch forces there, but were soon overwhelmed. Of these men, four were killed, while 206 became prisoners of war. The bulk of the division went straight to Australia, however, arriving in Adelaide in mid-March 1942. The following month, the division was moved to New South Wales where personnel were given a brief period of leave before moving on to Queensland. There they undertook defensive duties and training in light of the perceived threat of Japanese invasion. In April, the division was assigned to I Corps, First Army. In August, as the situation in New Guinea worsened, the decision was made to deploy the 7th Division. The 21st Brigade, under Brigadier Arnold Potts, was dispatched to Port Moresby, from where they would advance to help reinforce the units of the Militia, including the 39th Battalion, which were fighting a rearguard action on the Kokoda Track.

Simultaneously, the 18th Brigade, under the command of Brigadier George Wootten was sent to Milne Bay. Along with the 7th Brigade (a Militia formation), Royal Australian Air Force planes and ground staff, and a US engineer regiment, they successfully defended an airfield at the eastern tip of Papua from a major assault by Japanese Special Naval Landing Forces. The fighting came to be known as the Battle of Milne Bay, and was the first outright defeat of Japanese land forces in World War II. Corporal John French, from the 2/9th Battalion, was awarded a posthumous VC for his actions on 4 September 1942. The division's casualties at Milne Bay were 126 killed and 182 wounded.

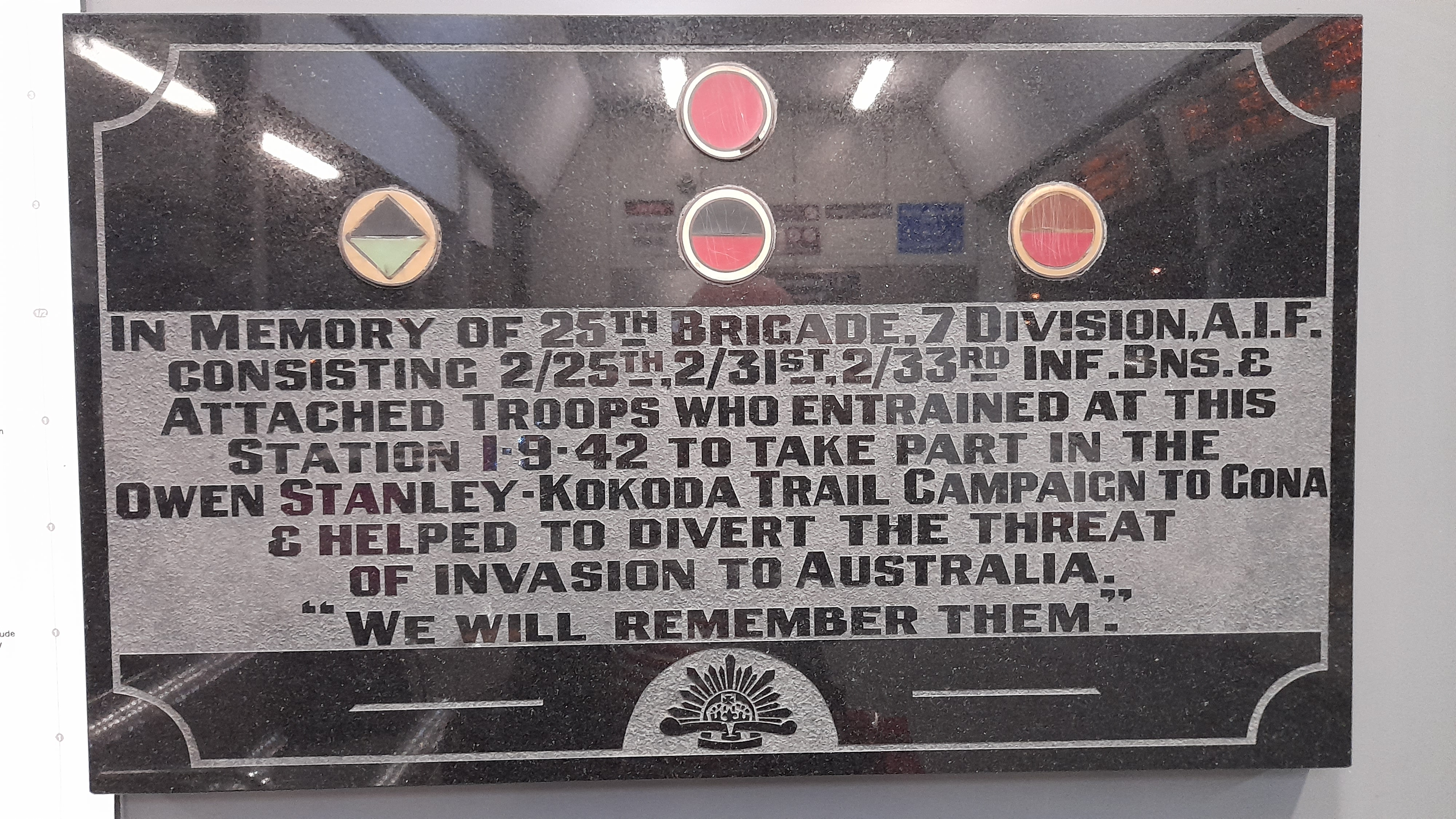
25Bn of 7Div plaque, at the railway station, Caboolture, Queensland.

Meanwhile, the Kokoda Track campaign had become a vicious, see-sawing battle, featuring fierce fighting around Kokoda itself and at Isurava where Private Bruce Kingsbury, from the 2/14th Battalion, was awarded a posthumous VC for his actions on 29 August. The Australians withdrew from Isurava, taking part in further actions around Templeton's Crossing and Efogi. The 25th Brigade joined the 21st at Ioribaiwa before the Australians made their final stand on Imita Ridge in mid September. Having been successfully delayed, the Japanese supply lines were now over extended and in October the 25th Brigade took part in the hard-fought advance that finally pushed the Japanese out of the Owen Stanley Range. During this stage of the fighting, actions were fought again at Templeton's Crossing and Oivi–Gorari before the Australians reached the Kumusi River on 13 November. During the fighting around the Kokoda Track, 359 men from the division were killed and another 560 were wounded.

The 21st Brigade returned for the Battle of Buna–Gona in late 1942, in which Australian and US forces suffered very high casualties, while capturing the main Japanese beachheads on the north coast of Papua. The 7th Division lost 750 men killed in this fighting and another 1,293 wounded. On 19 December 1942 QX5730 Sergeant Lionel Martindale Oxlade 2/7 Australian Division Cavalry Regiment was awarded an immediate Military Medal for having throughout the day and night shown qualities of courage and leadership which were an inspiration to his men. Between December 1942 and March 1943, the division was withdrawn back to Australia where, in early 1943, they were converted to the Jungle Divisional establishment, which saw a reduction in the division's manpower by around 4,000 personnel.

During 1943–1944, the whole 7th Division fought extensive and often bloody operations against Japanese forces in the north east of New Guinea. After the airborne landings at Nadzab, west of Lae, divisional troops were flown to the Ramu Valley and Markham Valley between 7 and 12 September. Beginning at Nadzab, where Private Richard Kelliher earned a VC, they successfully advanced to Lae simultaneous with the 9th Division, which fell on 16 September.

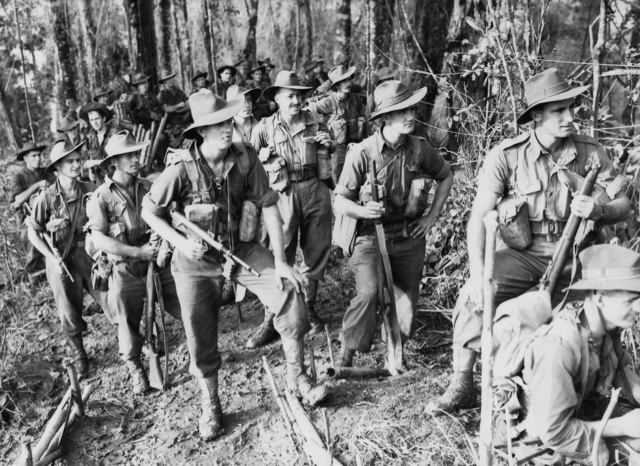
Troops of the 2/16th Infantry Battalion watch aircraft bombing Japanese positions prior to their attack on "The Pimple", Shaggy Ridge, New Guinea.

Following the fall of Lae, in late September 1943 the 7th Division was ordered to establish itself around Dumpu and Marawasa to guard the approaches to Lae and begin patrolling operations into the Finisterre Ranges. Limited by a supply line that depended entirely upon air support, the division could only deploy two brigades, the 21st and 25th. After the 2/6th Commando Squadron captured Kaipit, starting on 5 October, the 21st and 25th Brigades began the advance up with the 21st Brigade moving along the Faria River, aiming towards the Kankiryo Saddle, while the 25th Brigade advanced through the Ramu valley. The Japanese positions on Kankiryo and around Shaggy Ridge threatened the security of the airfields that had been established around Dumpu and, as a result, the decision was made for the 7th Division to capture them.

Throughout October a number of battles were fought. On 8–10 October, the 2/27th captured the high ground around Beveridge's Post, Trevor's Ridge and Pallier's Hill. On 11 October, a single platoon from the 2/14th Battalion destroyed a Japanese company at Pallier's Hill before a counterattack by 500 Japanese troops on the 2/27th's positions on John's Knoll and Trevor's Ridge was turned back on 12 October. In November, as the Australians approached the Japanese positions around Shaggy Ridge, the 25th Brigade took over from the 21st as the division's main effort. For the following month the division confined itself to patrolling operations only. In early December, the 21st Brigade took over from the 25th, and throughout late December 1943 and into January 1944 heavy fighting took place with attacks on the two Prothero features, Shaggy Ridge, Green Sniper's Pimple and the Kankiryo Saddle during the Battle of Shaggy Ridge. On 4 January 1944, the 18th Brigade relieved the 21st. By February, following an attack on Crater Hill, the main Japanese positions had been captured and shortly afterwards, elements of the 7th Division began to return to Australia. The 25th Brigade departed throughout January and February, and the 21st followed in February and March. The 18th Brigade remained in New Guinea until May, although they were replaced around Shaggy Ridge in February by the 15th Brigade, a Victorian Militia formation transferred from command under the 3rd Division and brought under the 7th Division in January.

As a show of gratitude to the assistance provided by locals, a memorial school was built at Situm by the Australian 7th Division AIF Association in 1964.

=== Borneo ===
In early 1944, the 7th Division returned to Australia in stages and, following a six-week period of leave, it toured the country conducting welcome home marches in a number of state capitals including Perth, Adelaide, Sydney and Melbourne. In April, the division began to re-form in north Queensland, where it undertook a long period of training in preparation for future operations, including amphibious assault training and brigade-level and division-level manoeuvres. Future operations were perceived to involve a possible commitment to the fighting in the Philippines in late 1944, but this did not eventuate. Finally, in May 1945, the division received orders to deploy overseas again and by 19 June they arrived on Morotai Island, where they began to prepare for operations in Borneo, as part of Operation Oboe.

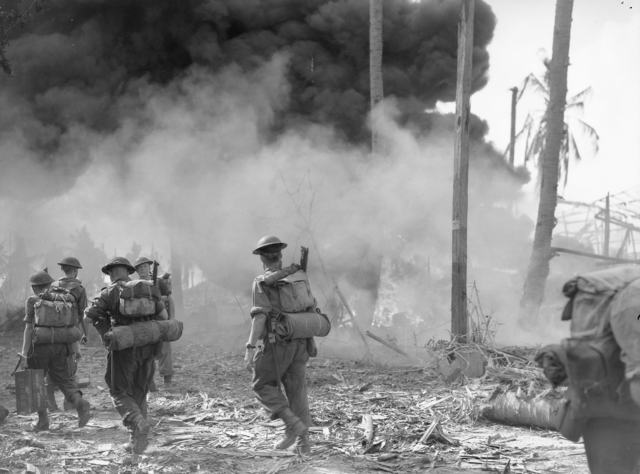
Members of the 7th Division at Balikpapan

In July 1945, the whole division, supported by the 2/1st Machine Gun Battalion and the Militia's 1st Armoured Regiment, was deployed in the Borneo campaign, and undertook the amphibious assault on Balikpapan, in Dutch Borneo. The initial landing took place on the southern coast on 1 July, with the 18th and 21st Brigades conducting the assault while the 25th Brigade remained at sea in reserve. Following its initial success on the first day, the 21st Brigade began the advance east, capturing an airfield at Seppinggang and crossing the Batakan Ketjil river where they came up against a strong Japanese force on 3 July. Meanwhile, the 18th Brigade secured the high ground around Klandasan before capturing the town of Balikpapan on 3 July. They were then subsequently relieved by the 25th Brigade. On 4 July, the 21st Brigade, having overcome the Japanese resistance that it had encountered the previous day, resumed their advance to the east. They were subsequently engaged by Japanese coastal defence artillery near the Manggar Besar river; they were unable to overcome this until 9 July. The 21st then captured Sambodja, 18 miles (29 km) from Manggar, before sending out patrols in support of the 25th Brigade.

The 25th Brigade advanced along the Milford Highway, moving to the north-east towards Samarinda. Coming up against a well-entrenched Japanese rear guard, the advance slowed as the position was reduced with artillery and air support, as the brigade began to encircle the position. Before this could be completed, however, the Japanese were able to withdraw from the position on the night of 21/22 July. This brought an end to the main combat operations, although the Australians continued patrol operations and minor clashes continued until the war ended in August. The campaign had cost the 7th Division 185 killed and 470 wounded.

Following the end of hostilities, the division remained in Borneo undertaking a variety of tasks including guarding Japanese prisoners and restoring law and order. As the demobilisation process began, members of the division were slowly repatriated to Australia or transferred to other units for further service. Some personnel were used to form the 65th Battalion, which was formed to undertake occupation duties in Japan as part of the British Commonwealth Occupation Force.

The 7th Division was finally disbanded in 1946. This was done in stages, with the divisional headquarters disbanding in January–February, and the division's component units disbanding between December 1945 and March 1946. A total of 2,063 men from the division were killed during the war, while a further 4,356 were wounded. Approximately 40,000 men served with the division between 1940 and 1946.

== Structure ==
The 7th Division consisted of the following units:

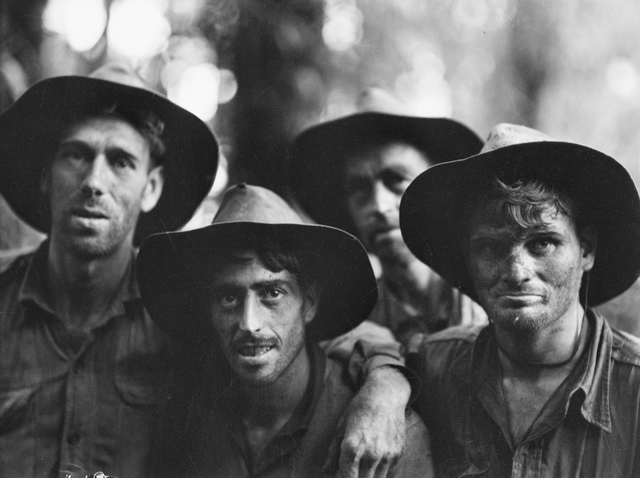
Members of "B" Company, 2/12th Battalion, who helped silence a Japanese mountain gun during the Battle of Prothero I & II. (Left to right) "Skinny" McQueen, Ron Lord, Eric Willey and Alan F Hackett. (Photographer: Colin Halmarick.)

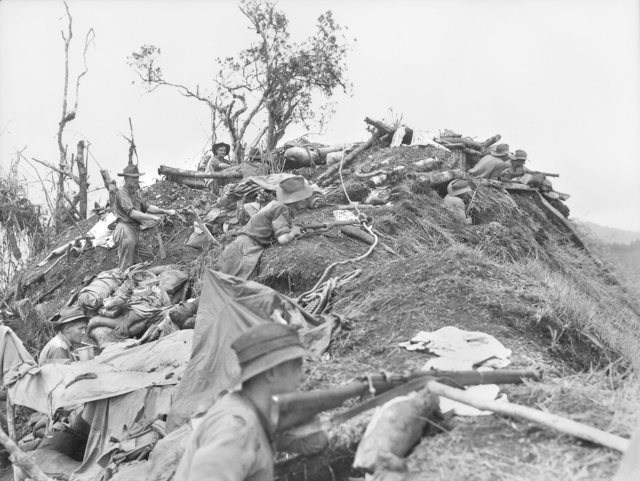
Members of "C" Company, 2/9th Infantry Battalion digging into a newly occupied part of Shaggy Ridge.

Main divisional units (with state of origin, where applicable)

- Infantry units
  - 15th Australian Infantry Brigade – from 3rd Division, January to July 1944, Markham and Ramu valleys
    - 24th Australian Infantry Battalion, Victoria
    - 57th/60th Australian Infantry Battalion, Victoria
    - 58th/59th Australian Infantry Battalion, Victoria
  - 18th Australian Infantry Brigade – from 6th Division in 1941.
    - 2/9th Australian Infantry Battalion, Queensland
    - 2/10th Australian Infantry Battalion, South Australia
    - 2/12th Australian Infantry Battalion, Queensland/Tasmania
  - 20th Australian Infantry Brigade – to 9th Division in 1941.
    - 2/13th Australian Infantry Battalion, New South Wales
    - 2/15th Australian Infantry Battalion, Queensland
    - 2/17th Australian Infantry Battalion, New South Wales
  - 21st Australian Infantry Brigade
    - 2/14th Australian Infantry Battalion, Victoria
    - 2/16th Australian Infantry Battalion, Western Australia
    - 2/27th Australian Infantry Battalion, South Australia
  - 25th Australian Infantry Brigade – from 9th Division, 1941.
    - 2/25th Australian Infantry Battalion, Queensland (from 24th Brigade, 9th Division, 1940)
    - 2/31st Australian Infantry Battalion, Queensland
    - 2/33rd Australian Infantry Battalion, New South Wales
- Artillery regiments
  - 2/4th Field Regiment, Royal Australian Artillery (RAA)
  - 2/5th Field Regiment, RAA
  - 2/6th Field Regiment, RAA
  - 2/2nd Anti-Tank Regiment, RAA
- Other units
  - 2/2nd Australian Machine-Gun Battalion (until January 1942)
  - 2/3rd Australian Machine-Gun Battalion (mid-1941)
  - 2/2nd Australian Pioneer Battalion, Victoria
  - 7th Aust Divisional Cavalry
- Engineers
  - 2/4th Field Company, Royal Australian Engineers (RAE), New South Wales
  - 2/5th Field Company, RAE, New South Wales
  - 2/6th Field Company, RAE, New South Wales
  - 2/2nd Field Park Company, RAE, Western Australia
  - 7th Aust Division Salvage Unit

Corps level units attached to the division

- Corps Troops Artillery
  - 2/9th Army Field Regiment, RAA (originally 8th Division)
  - 2/11th Army Field Regiment, RAA (originally 8th Division)
  - 2/13th Army Field Regiment, RAA (converted from 2/1st Medium Regiment RAA, October 1940.)
  - 2/1st Survey Regiment, RAA
- 1st Australian Anti-Aircraft Brigade
  - 2/1st Anti-Aircraft Regiment, RAA
  - 2/2nd Heavy Anti-Aircraft Regiment, RAA
  - 2/3rd Light Anti-Aircraft Regiment, RAA
- Corps Troops Engineers
  - General engineer units
    - 2/7th Army Field Company, RAE, Queensland
    - 2/8th Army Field Company, RAE, Victoria (Transferred to the 6th Division)
    - 2/9th Army Field Company, RAE, Tasmania/Victoria
    - 2/3rd Corps Field Park Company, RAE, South Australia
  - Base and Lines of Communications Units
    - HQ Railway Group
    - 1st Railway Construction Company, RAE
    - 2nd Railway Construction Company, RAE
    - 3rd Railway Construction Company, RAE
    - 1st Railway Survey Company, RAE
    - HQ Forestry Group
    - 1st Forestry Companies, RAE
    - 2nd Forestry Companies, RAE
    - 3rd Forestry Companies, RAE

== Commanders ==
The following officers served as commanding officer of the 7th Division:

- Major General John Lavarack, February 1941 – June 1941;
- Major General Arthur "Tubby" Allen, June 1941 – October 1942;
- Major General George Alan Vasey, October 1942 – July 1944;
- Major General Edward Milford, July 1944 – August 1945.
