= 6th Machine Gun Battalion =

6th Machine Gun Battalion may refer to:

- 6th Machine Gun Battalion (Australia)
- 6th Machine Gun Battalion (United States Marine Corps)
