= Shaggy Ridge =

- Ridge
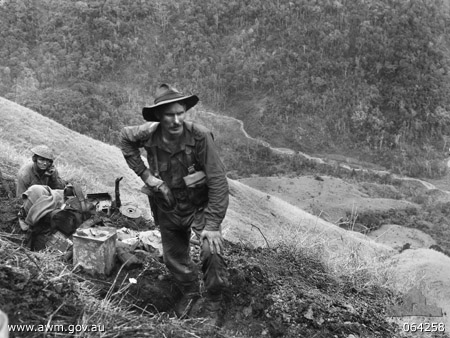
- Two Australian soldiers on Shaggy Ridge on 21 January 1944

- Location in Papua New Guinea
- Coordinates: 5°46.36′S 145°44.23′E
- Location: Papua New Guinea
- Range: Finisterre Range
- Elevation: 1,497 m (4,911 ft)

Shaggy Ridge is a 6.5 kilometres (4.0 mi) long razorback (stratigraphic) ridge in the Finisterre Range, in north eastern Papua New Guinea. Its highest point is 1,497 metres (4,911 ft) above sea level. The ridge is located between the valleys of the Mene and Faria Rivers and culminates at one end in Kankiryo Saddle, which links it to Faria Ridge and divides Faria Valley and Mindjim River Valley. From the Ramu Valley, the ridge runs NNW, and the highest point is located at 145°44.23'E:5°46.36'S.

== History ==
The ridge was named after an Australian soldier, Captain Robert "Shaggy Bob" Clampett, commander of "A" Company, 2/27th Infantry Battalion, the first Allied ground unit to reconnoitre the area during World War II. Shaggy Ridge was the site of several battles during the Finisterre Range campaign of 1943–1944. The ridge was the site of major Japanese defensive positions, blocking access from the Ramu Valley to the north coast of New Guinea. In December 1943, the Australian 7th Division attacked; the difficult terrain made this a famous campaign which did not end until the last Japanese positions were captured in January.

The battles on Shaggy Ridge itself were:

- Battle of The Pimple
- Battle of Cam's Saddle
- Battle of Faria Ridge
- Battle of Prothero I and II
- Battle of McCaughey's Knoll
- Battle of Kankiryo Saddle
- Battle of Crater Hill

== In popular culture ==
Fighting at Shaggy Ridge was featured in the Australian documentary Jungle Patrol (1944).
