= Tom Gurr =

Australian journalist (1904–1995)

Thomas Johnson Gurr (1904, Dunedin, New Zealand – 9 August 1995) was an Australian journalist and documentary filmmaker. He worked for Cinesound Productions writing commentary for newsreels until 1933 when he left to join Associated Newspapers. By 1938 he was editor in chief at the Sunday Telegraph and he later edited the Sydney Sun.

During the war, Tom served as a War Correspondent with Associated Newspapers. He became a member of the Australian Commonwealth Government Editors' Delegation and travelled to Indonesia, Malaysia, and Korea, and watched the D-Day invasion from above, flying over the scene. Tom was decorated with seven service medals for his work as a war correspondent, and marched in every Anzac Day ceremony in Sydney, Australia, until the age of 90.

During World War II he also wrote and directed the classic action documentary film Jungle Patrol (1944), and later made a similar film during the Korean War, One Man's War (1952).

His sister, Nancy Gurr (Thompson), was also a pioneer of the Australian film industry. His brother, Rodney Gurr, worked for MGM in the US before returning to Australia. Their father "Thomas Stuart Gurr" was a novelist and writer.

== Filmography ==
- South West Pacific (1943) – writer
- Jungle Patrol (1944) – writer, director
- One Man's War (1952) – writer, director
