= Markham, Ramu and Finisterre campaigns =

Second World War military campaign

Markham Valley, Ramu Valley and Finisterre Range campaigns
- Part of the New Guinea campaign of the Pacific Theater (World War II)
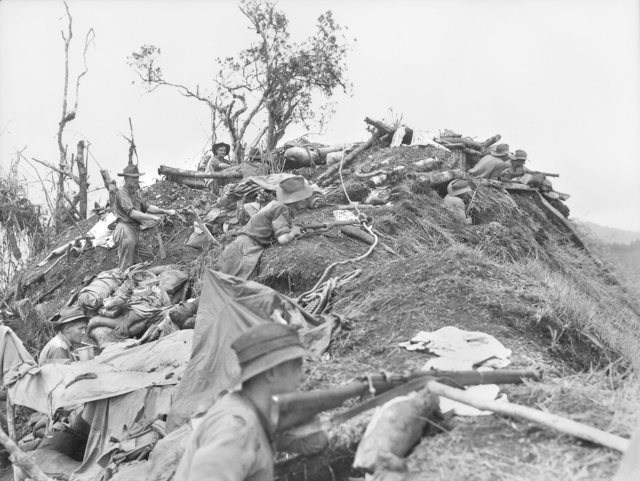
- Members of 'C' Company, Australian 2/9th Infantry Battalion, digging in at a newly occupied part of Shaggy Ridge on 23 January 1944
Date	19 September 1943 – 24 April 1944
Location	Finisterre Range, Territory of New Guinea
Result	Allied victory

Belligerents
Australia; United States	Japan

Commanders and leaders
(Australia) George Vasey	(Empire of Japan) Masutaro Nakai

Units involved
7th Division 11th Division	18th Army: Nakai Detachment

Strength
~ 17,000	~ 12,000

Casualties and losses
204 killed 464 wounded	800 killed 400 wounded

The Markham Valley, Ramu Valley and Finisterre Range campaigns were a series of battles within the broader New Guinea campaign of World War II. The campaigns began with an Allied offensive in the Ramu Valley, from 19 September 1943, and concluded when Allied troops entered Madang on 24 April 1944. During the campaign, Australian forces – supported by Australian and US aircraft – advanced through the Markham Valley and Ramu Valleys during which there were minor clashes with Japanese forces, which withdrew towards their main defensive line in the Finisterre Range.

A central geographical and strategic feature of these campaigns was the imposing Shaggy Ridge, running north–south in the Finisterres; this was the scene of a climactic battle during which the Australians assaulted the Japanese positions in December 1943 and January 1944. Following the fighting around Shaggy Ridge, the Japanese withdrew towards the northern coast of New Guinea, where they were pursued by Australian and US forces advancing through the Finisterres and along the coast from Saidor. Following the capture of Madang, the Japanese eventually withdrew to Wewak where further fighting took place in 1944 and 1945.

== Background ==
=== Strategic situation ===
During September 1943, Australian forces from Major General George Vasey's 7th Division, advancing from Nadzab, had captured Lae, as part of a pincer undertaken in conjunction with Major General George Wootten's 9th Division, which had advanced along the coast from the east of Lae. Heavy rain had held up the Australian advance and much of the garrison had managed to withdraw inland, prior to the capture of the town. To follow these forces up, the 9th Division's focus then shifted to the Huon Peninsula, while the 7th Division – following the capture of Kaiapit – advanced from there to Dumpu and Marawasa, to prepare for the Australian advance through the Ramu Valley and into the Finisterre Range, towards Bogadjim near Madang on the northern coast.

=== Opposing forces ===
The Japanese formation in the campaign was the Nakai Detachment, a brigade-sized formation detached from the Japanese 20th Division under Major General Masutaro Nakai. The area was defended by several battalions of the 78th Infantry Regiment, supported by the 26th Artillery Regiment and the 27th Independent Engineer Regiment. The II/78th and two companies of the III/78th were deployed forward around Kankiryo and Shaggy Ridge, with the I/78th spread out around Saipa and Yokopi and the remaining two companies of the III/78th at Yaula, the 239th Infantry Regiment held the rear around Madang, Erima and Bogadjim, along with 2,000 unassigned reinforcements; this was a force of about 12,000 men. It faced the Australian 7th Division, consisting of approximately 17,000 men, under Vasey, and made up of the 18th, 21st and 25th Brigades, along with the 2/6th Commando Squadron.

== Campaign ==
=== Advance into the Markham and Ramu Valleys ===
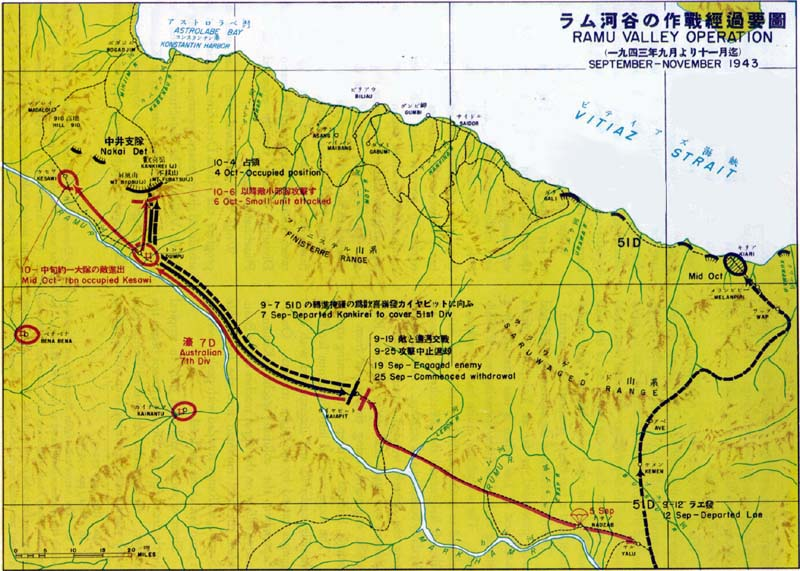
Markham and Ramu Valley Operations, September–November 1943

The campaign began in September 1943 following the 7th Division's drive on Lae, as part of the wider New Guinea campaign, which saw the 9th Division carrying out operations along the Huon Peninsula on the coast to the east, while the 7th moved towards the west. Carrying out a number of smaller-scale operations, the units of the 21st and 25th Brigades advanced up the Markham and Ramu Valleys. Apart from a significant engagement around Kaiapit, where the 2/6th Commando Squadron captured the village and killed over 200 Japanese. The Australians were barely resisted as they advanced and they arrived in Dumpu in early October. During the entire advance, the Australian and American forces in the Ramu Valley were supplied by air. The capture of the Ramu Valley, allowed a forward airbase to be developed at Gusap.

Following this, the 7th Division provided security for a number of airfields that were constructed in the territory they had captured in the valleys. To assist with this, the 6th Machine Gun Battalion was brought up from Port Moresby to defend Gusap. However, the Japanese remained in strong possession of the Finisterre Range, and their positions at Kankiryo Saddle north of the Ramu river and the 1,500 m (4,900 ft) high razorback ridge named Shaggy Ridge, continued to threaten the airfields. This threat manifested itself in the road that the Japanese were attempting to build from Madang on the coast inland to Nadzab, via Bogadjim, along which they were hoping to advance through to Dumpu.

Thus, the Kankiryo Saddle and Shaggy Ridge were of vital strategic importance for both the Japanese and the Australians. For the Japanese, it provided a strong obstacle to the Australian advance north towards the coast, while also offering them the ground along which they could launch their own offensive in order to recapture the territory they had lost earlier in the campaign. For the Australians, the Japanese positions on the high ground signalled threat and their commander, Vasey, came to the decision that he would have to launch an offensive in order to capture this ground.

=== Into the Finnisterres and the attack on Shaggy Ridge ===
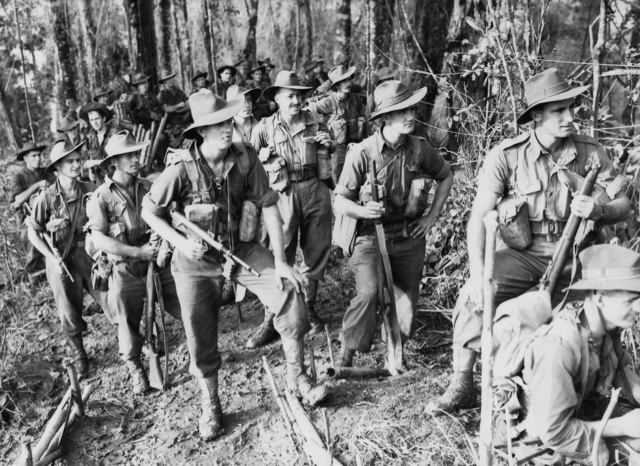
Troops of the 2/16th Infantry Battalion, watch aircraft bombarding The Pimple prior to their attack on Japanese positions there, 27 December 1943.

This led to a number of battles in the steep mountains of the Finnisterres. In October, battles took place at Palliser's Hill, and then later at Johns' Knoll where the Australians first managed to capture the knoll and then held it against a determined Japanese counterattack. In November, the 25th Brigade relieved the 21st as the offensive was maintained, and later in December and into January heavy fighting took place around Shaggy Ridge, a 6.5-kilometre (4.0 mi) long spur dotted by several rocky outcrops. The Japanese had established numerous strong posts and positions along the ridge, blocking the Australian advance towards the coast, where they were aiming to secure Bogadjim and Madang. The initial attacks on Shaggy Ridge began on 27 December with a heavy artillery and air preparation of the Japanese positions around The Pimple, a steep rocky outcrop, which commanded the southern half of the position and had prevented the Australians advancing over the previous two months. These preparatory fires were followed by an assault up the steep slopes of The Pimple by the 2/16th Infantry Battalion, which employed ladders made out of bamboo to help scale the face of the slope. Held up overnight by a Japanese pillbox, the 2/16th resorted to explosives to destroy it.

Early in the new year, the 15th and 18th Brigades relieved the 21st and 25th Brigades around Shaggy Ridge, and planning for a new offensive began. The major Australian attack on Shaggy Ridge – codenamed Operation Cutthroat – was launched by the 18th Brigade on 19–20 January. The 2/4th Field Regiment, which established its guns around the Lake area to the west of the Mosia River, and south of Guy's Post, while stores were brought up to that position by jeep. The brigade's three battalions were to converge on the Kankiryo Saddle from three different directions: the 2/12th Infantry Battalion was to advance from Canning's Saddle, east of Shaggy Ridge, and attack two well-defended knolls on the northern end of Shaggy Ridge, known as Prothero I and II; the 2/9th Infantry Battalion would attack northwards along Shaggy Ridge itself, to take McCaughey's Knoll, by way of Green Sniper's Pimple; and the 2/10th Infantry Battalion would advance along Faria Ridge, which lay to the east of Shaggy Ridge and joined it at Kankiryo Saddle.

After the Kankiryo Saddle was secured on 26 January 1944, the Japanese withdrew to Crater Hill. From there, they had good observation of the saddle to the south-west, and they established a strong position. The Australians surrounded the position and over the course of a week reduced the position with patrolling and air attacks, forcing the Japanese defenders to abandon the position on 31 January 1944, and fall back to Paipa. Casualties during the fighting to secure Shaggy Ridge amounted to up to 500 Japanese killed, and 46 killed and 147 wounded for the Australians.

=== Pursuit towards Madang ===
Shortly after Shaggy Ridge was captured, the 18th Brigade was replaced by the 15th Brigade, a Militia formation. As the Australians began consolidating their position, the 7th Division was ordered to limit its exploitation, while supplies were pushed forward of Kankiryo. Meanwhile, in an effort to harass the Japanese rearguard, the 57th/60th Infantry Battalion undertook a program of long range patrols to the north. A landing by two US battalions around the Yalau Plantation pushed the Japanese further back, but nevertheless, their rearguards continued to provide determined resistance and the Australians advanced towards Bogadjim, pursuing the Japanese forces as they withdrew.

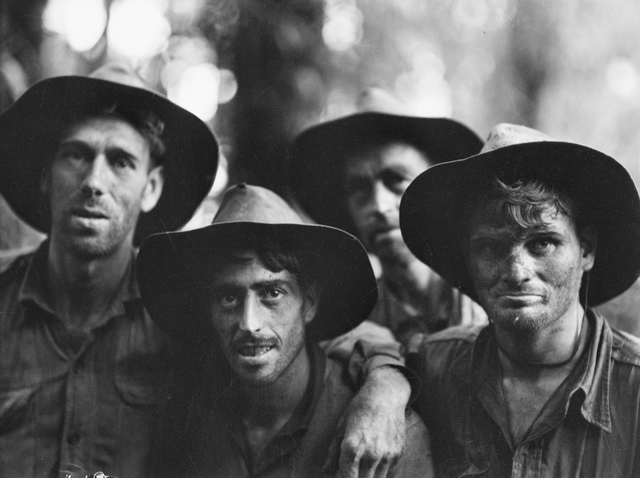
Members of "B" Company, Australian 2/12th Battalion, who helped silence a Japanese mountain gun on one of the hills known as Prothero I & II, 22 January 22, 1944.

Yaula was captured on 4 April linking up with elements of the 2/2nd Commando Squadron. A few days later, the 11th Division, under the command of Major General Allan Boase took over from the 7th, and they subsequently linked up with US forces on the coast around Rimba as they pushed forward along an axis bounded by the Kabenau and Nuru Rivers. Bogadjim was reached on 13 April and on 23 April troops from the 8th Brigade came ashore there, effecting a link up between the 5th Division, which had been advancing along the coast from Saidor, which had been secured by US and Australian forces in January – February 1944. Madang was subsequently taken on 24–25 April by troops from the 8th and 15th Brigades, while the 30th Infantry Battalion secured Alexishafen the following day. A follow-up landing was made by the 37th/52nd Infantry Battalion on Karkar Island, while the 35th Infantry Battalion secured a large quantity of abandoned Japanese stores at Hansa Bay, and pushed patrols towards the Sepik River.

== Aftermath ==
For the Australians, the advance through the Markham, Ramu and Faria Valleys proved to be a hard slog. Casualties for the 7th Division between 18 September 1943 and 8 April 1944 amounted to 204 killed and 464 wounded. Disease took an even greater toll with 13,576 personnel being evacuated. Japanese estimates of their own casualties indicate losses of 800 killed, 400 wounded and 800 dead from disease.

With the capture of Madang, the Allies finally effectively secured the Huon Peninsula; nevertheless, the Allies were unable to prevent the Japanese defenders from withdrawing and, as a result, they were unsuccessful in completely destroying them. Following the fall of Madang, the remnants of the Japanese 18th Army eventually withdrew to the Wewak area with the intention of falling back to Hollandia. That base fell before they could arrive after the Allies launched Operations Reckless and Persecution, and consequently they remained in the Wewak area. US forces from the 41st Infantry Division subsequently landed at Aitape and in mid- to late 1944, US and Japanese forces clashed during the Battle of Driniumor River. In late 1944, the Australian 6th Division arrived to relieve the US garrison, and the Australian forces subsequently launched the Aitape–Wewak campaign, fighting a campaign to secure the airfield and then clear the Japanese from the inland areas patrolling through the Torricelli and Prince Alexander mountain ranges.

Fighting during the campaign was featured in the Australian documentary Jungle Patrol (1944). After the war, the Australian Army awarded the units that participated in the campaign several battle honours. These were: Ramu Valley, Shaggy Ridge, Finisterres, Barum, Bogadjim, and Madang.
