= Masutaro Nakai =

Japanese general (1895–1969)

- 中井 増太郎
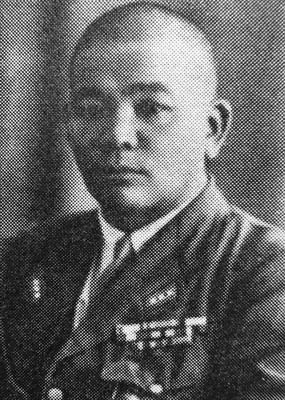
- Born: 13 October 1895; Tottori Prefecture, Japan
- Died: 11 October 1969 (aged 73)
- Military career
- Allegiance: Empire of Japan
- Branch: Imperial Japanese Army
- Service years: 1917–1945
- Rank: Lieutenant General
- Conflicts: Second Sino-Japanese War; World War II

Masutaro Nakai (中井増太郎, Nakai Masutaro; 13 October 1895 – 11 October 1969) was a general in the Imperial Japanese Army, commanding Japanese ground forces in the Southwest Pacific during the closing months of the war. He led a brigade-sized formation, known as the Nakai Detachment, which had been detached from the 20th Division during the Markham, Ramu and Finisterre campaigns. Nakai was later placed in command on the IJA 20th Division.

== Biography ==
Nakai was born in Tottori Prefecture. He graduated from the 29th class of the Imperial Japanese Army Academy in May 1917 and from the 42nd class of the Army Staff College in November 1930. As a junior officer, Nakai participated in the Siberian Expedition. In the 1930s, he had extensive experience in China, where he served as a military attaché from 1937. In May 1939, he was promoted to colonel and in September of the same year was assigned to the China Expeditionary Army on the front lines of combat in central China in the Second Sino-Japanese War. From 1939 to 1940, Nakai served on the senior staff of the IJA 21st Army tasked with the Canton Operation, and from February 1940, on the senior staff of the IJA 22nd Army, a garrison force in Guangxi which fought at the Battle of South Guangxi and which was disbanded for its insubordination in invading French Indochina. Nakai was sent back to Tokyo, but returned later in 1940 as a member of the staff of the Indochina Expeditionary Army.

After a brief stint as an instructor at the Toyama Army Infantry School, Nakai was assigned the post of chief-of-staff of the IJA 20th Division, based in Korea. In January 1943, the IJA 20th Division was transferred to the Japanese Eighteenth Army in the Southern Area Command (eastern New Guinea). In August 1943, Nakai was promoted to major general and placed in command of the infantry group. On the death of General Shigeru Katagiri in April 1944, Nakai became acting commander of the IJA 20th Division. In April 1945, he was promoted to lieutenant general. He and his surviving forces held out against the Australian Army in the Markham, Ramu and Finisterre campaigns and other combat operations in New Guinea until the end of the war.
