= 2/4th Field Regiment (Australia) =

Australian Army artillery regiment

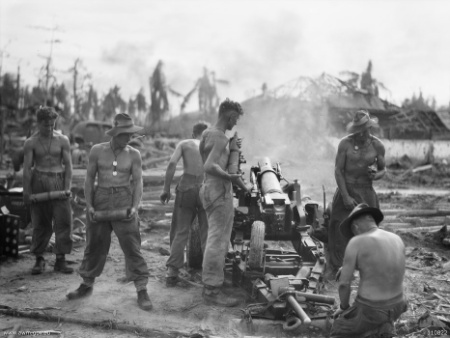
- A 2/4th Short 25-pounder firing at Balikpapan, July 1945
- Active: 1940–46
- Country: Australia
- Branch: Australian Army
- Type: Regiment
- Role: Artillery
- Size: 3 batteries
- Part of: 7th Division
- Engagements: World War II: North African Campaign; Syria–Lebanon Campaign; Salamaua–Lae campaign; Finisterre Range campaign; Borneo campaign

Insignia
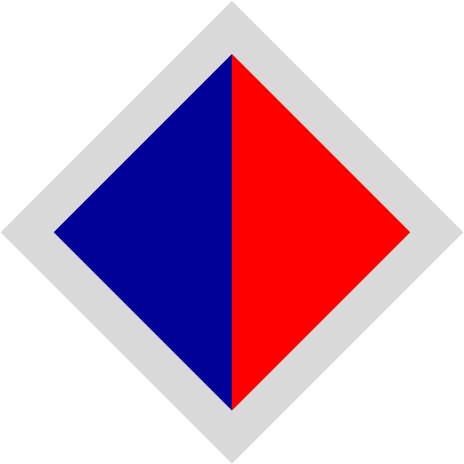
- Unit colour patch

The 2/4th Field Regiment was an Australian Army artillery regiment formed on 2 May 1940, as part of the 7th Division during World War II. The regiment was involved in campaigns in North Africa, Syria–Lebanon, Salamaua–Lae, the Finisterre Ranges and Borneo. After training in Victoria, the regiment deployed to North Africa in late 1940. After being deployed in the defence of Mersa Matruh in Egypt in early 1941, the regiment took part in the fighting against the Vichy French in Syria and Lebanon, before undertaking garrison duties there. It returned to Australia in early 1942 following Japan's entry into the war, and in September 1943, a small group of artillerymen from the 2/4th parachuted with two short 25 Pounder guns in the airborne landing at Nadzab airstrip in New Guinea in support of the U.S. Army's 503rd Parachute Infantry Regiment. Later, the regiment took part in the 7th Division's advance through the Finisterre Range before returning to Australia in early 1944. Its final involvement in the war came around Balikpapan in 1945. After the war, the regiment was disbanded on 7 February 1946.

== History ==
Raised on 7 May 1940, as part of the 7th Division at Caulfield Racecourse, in Melbourne, Victoria, the regiment was initially formed with two three-troop batteries: the 7th and 8th. Each battery consisted of three troops and four QF 18 pounders. The regiment's initial volunteers were drawn mainly from Victoria, with many having previously served in local Militia artillery units. Artillery guns were scarce at the time and training was completed at Puckapunyal, Victoria, using guns borrowed from other units. On 21 October 1940, still without its own guns, the regiment embarked from Port Melbourne bound for the Middle East. Disembarking at El Kantara, in Egypt, on the Suez Canal in November. Its next destination was Deir Suneid, Palestine, traveling by train, where it undertook training, before receiving some artillery guns in January 1941. After moving to Ikingi Maryut, Egypt, in mid-April it finally was equipped with 25-pounders, 18-pounders, and 4.5 inch howitzers.

After Tobruk was placed under siege by Axis forces in April 1941, the regiment moved to the fortress at Mersa Matruh, Egypt, with four guns being deployed forward in an anti-tank role. In May, the regiment received new 25-pounders at Tel el Kebir, Egypt, from the 9th Division before the Allies launched the Syria–Lebanon Campaign and moved to Affula, Palestine. As part of the invasion of Syria and Lebanon held at the time by the Vichy French, the regiment supported the Australian 21st Brigade's advance along the coast. Crossing the border on 8 June, the 7th Battery, as part of the advance guard which overlooked the Litani River, fired the first artillery shots of the campaign, subsequently providing critical fire support which allowed a bridgehead to be secured. During the fighting that followed the regiment undertook anti-tank, direct-fire tasks, counter battery fire and came under enemy air and naval attack. At the conclusion of the campaign, the 2/4th remained in Syria undertaking garrison duty. During its time there the regiment was expanded to include a third battery, which was designated the 54th Battery.

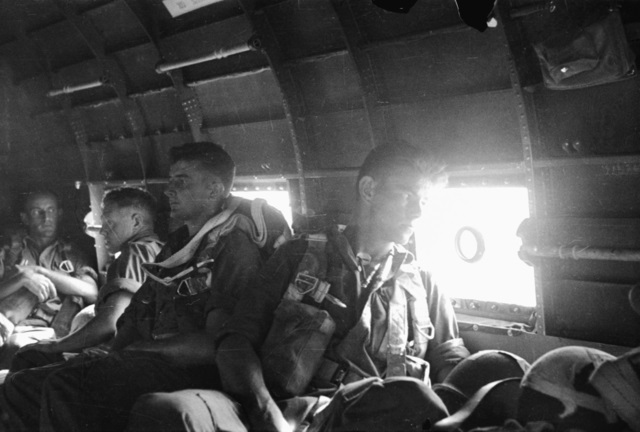
2/4th gunner's aboard a C-47 prior to a combat jump over Nadzab, September 1943

As part of the transfer of Australian combat troops to the Pacific, the 2/4th was withdrawn from Syria in December 1941 and subsequently transported back to Australia to help bolster the garrison there following Japan's entry into the war. In May 1942, after a period of leave, the regiment concentrated around Caloundra, in Queensland, after which a long period of training for jungle warfare took place. During this time the regiment was warned out for possible deployment on a number of occasions, but was ultimately not required. Some personnel were detached for service in New Guinea around Milne Bay and with "Lilliput Force", but the regiment did not see action again until early September 1943 when the 54th Battery deployed a detachment of 31 artillerymen and two Short 25-pound artillery pieces to support the US 503rd Parachute Infantry Regiment's airborne landing at Nadzab, as part of Allied efforts to capture Lae during the Salamaua–Lae campaign. Following the successful capture of Nadzab, the rest of the regiment was transported by air and supported the Australian 25th Brigade's advance on Lae, and then the Australian 7th Division's subsequent involvement in the Finisterre Range campaign, during which its fire played a significant role in the successful capture of Shaggy Ridge by the Australian infantry on 27 December.

The regiment was withdrawn to Australia in February 1944 for rest and reorganisation. A period was spent at Strathpine, Queensland, and then later the regiment moved to the Atherton Tablelands where the 7th Division prepared for its final campaign of the war in Borneo. It was over a year before the regiment was deployed again, transiting through Morotai Island in June 1945 before supporting the division's landing at Balikpapan in July. Landing on the second day of the operation, the regiment operated in support of the Australian 18th Brigade. After a short campaign, the war came to an end in August 1945 and the demobilisation process began. Personnel were transferred from the unit for subsequent service, or were repatriated to Australia for discharge, before the regiment was finally returned to Australia for disbandment. This occurred on 7 February 1946, while the regiment was based at Chermside, in Brisbane. A total of 30 personnel from the regiment were killed in action during the war, or died while on active service.

== Commanders ==
The 2/4th was commanded by the following officers:

- Lieutenant Colonel Lewis Ernest Stephen Barker
- Lieutenant Colonel John Reddish
- Lieutenant Colonel Dudley Grahame MacDougal
- Lieutenant Colonel Walter Louis Rau

== Sub-units ==
The 2/4th Field Regiment consisted of the following sub-units:

- 7th Battery
- 8th Battery
- 54th Battery
