= Bogadjim =

Coordinates: 5.456579°S 145.736607°E

Bogadjim is a village on Astrolabe Bay, just south of Madang, in Astrolabe Bay Rural LLG, Madang Province, Papua New Guinea. During World War II, the Japanese started to build a track from Bogadjim over the Finisterre Mountains into the Ramu Valley and the village became an important base.

The Anjam or Bogadjim language is spoken in the village.
