= 78th Infantry Regiment (Imperial Japanese Army) =

The 78th Infantry Regiment was an infantry regiment in the Imperial Japanese Army. The regiment began operation on 18 April 1916 and was attached to the 39th Infantry Brigade of the 20th Division. The regiment participated during the Second Sino-Japanese War and during the later stages of World War II, the regiment was in New Guinea, as part of the Japanese Eighteenth Army.

== Organization ==
- 1st Battalion
- 2nd Battalion
- 3rd Battalion

== Commanders ==
- Colonel Tomitarō Horii (1938 - 1941)
