= Finisterre Range =

Mountain range in north-eastern Papua New Guinea

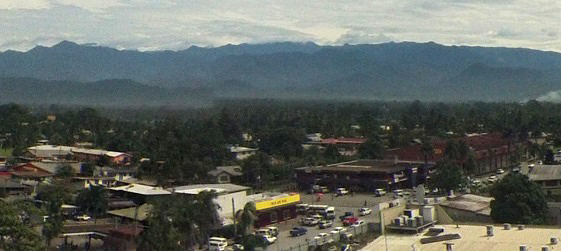
- Finisterre Range as seen from Lae

Highest point
- Elevation: 4,155 m (13,632 ft)
- Prominence: 3,709 m (12,169 ft); Ranked 41st
- Listing: Ultra, Ribu
- Coordinates: 05°57′15″S 146°22′30″E

Dimensions
- Length: 297 km (185 mi)

Geography
- Location within Papua New Guinea
- Location: Papua New Guinea
- Parent range: Finisterre Mountains

Climbing
- First ascent: 25 June 2014
- Easiest route: YDS class 3

The Finisterre Range is a mountain range in north-eastern Papua New Guinea. The highest point is ranked 41st in the world by prominence with an elevation of 4,155 m. Although the range's high point is not named on official maps, the name "Mount Boising" is used locally. This peak was possibly the most prominent unclimbed peak in the world until the first known ascent on 25 June 2014.

The range runs into the Saruwaged Range to the east and together they form a natural barrier between the Ramu and Markham valleys to the south and Vitiaz Strait to the north. Many rivers originate in this range, including some tributaries of the Ramu.

== History ==
The Finisterre Range campaign (1943–1944) of World War II, including a series of actions known as Battle of Shaggy Ridge, saw fierce fighting between Australian and Japanese forces. It featured in the film Jungle Patrol (1944).

== See also ==
- List of highest mountains of New Guinea
- List of Ultras of Oceania
- Finisterre languages
