= Alex Bath MacDonald =

Australian Army officer (1898–1981)

Alex MacDonald
- Born: 13 April 1898; Walcha, New South Wales
- Died: 12 May 1981 (aged 83); Sydney, New South Wales
- Military career
- Allegiance: Australia
- Branch: Australian Army
- Service years: 1940–1950
- Rank: Lieutenant Colonel
- Nickname: Bandy
- Commands: Australian Cadet Corps; Jungle Training Centre; Darwin Mobile Force
- Conflicts: Second World War

Lieutenant Colonel Alex Bath "Bandy" MacDonald (13 April 1898 – 12 May 1981) was an Australian Army officer.

== Family and education ==
MacDonald was born in Walcha, New South Wales, son of Emily (née Bath) and Alexander Mark MacDonald. He was educated at Newington College from 1913 until 1916.

== Military service ==
MacDonald served during the Second World War and commanded the Jungle Training Centre and Darwin Mobile Force. At war's end he became Director of the Australian Cadet Corps and then was senior Australian military observer with the United Nations Commission for Indonesia. He was discharged from the army on April 13, 1950. His portrait is held by the Australian War Memorial.
