= 10th Independent Rifle Company, Royal Australian Regiment =

Former Australian Army unit

- Active: 15 June 1971 – 1998
- Country: Australia
- Branch: Army
- Type: Line infantry
- Role: Training, OPFOR
- Size: Company minus — Platoon plus
- Part of: Land Warfare Centre, Canungra
- Garrison/HQ: Kokoda Barracks
- Motto(s): Duty First
- March: Men of Harlech

Commanders
- Colonel-in-Chief: HM The Queen (Australian Infantry Corps)

Insignia
- Unit colour patch

10th Independent Rifle Company, Royal Australian Regiment (10 IRC RAR) was part of the Australian Army.

The establishment of a "demonstration platoon" at the Jungle Training Centre (JTC), (later renamed Land Warfare Centre) at Canungra, Queensland was authorised on 4 January 1966. This became the Headquarters 1st Division Defence Company on 19 March 1968, before being designated 10 IRC RAR on 15 June 1971.

The company was tasked with supporting the activities of Battle Wing – a training centre set up to provide collective training – by providing personnel for OPFOR, demonstration, and other training tasks. In 1974, 10 IRC had a strength of approximately 60 men, consisting of a company headquarters and two rifle platoons with two rifle sections each. This was reduced to a 40-man platoon on 29 March 1980. The company was disbanded in 1998 with its personnel posted to other units of the RAR.
