= Australian Army Land Warfare Centre, Western Australia =

The Land Warfare Centre WA in Fremantle, Western Australia was a training centre element of the Land Warfare Centre (LWC) headquartered in Canungra Queensland Australian Army based at Leeuwin Barracks to meet the needs of combat training. Having previously been designated Regional Training Centre WA - a sub-unit of Headquarters Regional Training Units (HQ RTC), it changed names when HQ RTC reverted in name when HQ RTC reverted to LWC. The training centre was disestablished on 1 January 2009.

The last Commandant of the Land Warfare Centre was Brigadier Stephen Gerard Cain.

== See also ==
- Land Warfare Centre (Australia)
