= Independent Rifle Company =

Independent Rifle Companies are former Australian Army formations. These formations existed as stand-alone infantry companies that were augmented with their own organic combat service support elements.

== Former Units ==
1st Independent Rifle Company, Royal Victoria Regiment - Based in Mildura, Disbanded

5th Independent Rifle Company, Pilbara Regiment (1982-1985) - became the Pilbara Regiment

7th Independent Rifle Company (????-1981) - became NORFORCE

10th Independent Rifle Company, Royal Australian Regiment (1966-1998) - dissolved

11th Independent Rifle Company, Royal Western Australian Regiment (1977-1987) - merged with 28th Independent Rifle Company to form 11th/28th Battalion, Royal Western Australia Regiment

12th Independent Rifle Company (1975-1987) - merged with 40th Independent Rifle Company to form 12th/40th Battalion, Royal Tasmanian Regiment

28th Independent Rifle Company, Royal Western Australian Regiment (1977-1987) - merged with 11th Independent Rifle Company to form 11th/28th Battalion, Royal Western Australia Regiment

40th Independent Rifle Company (1975-1987) - merged with 12th Independent Rifle Company to form 12th/40th Battalion, Royal Tasmanian Regiment

51st Independent Rifle Company, Royal Queensland Regiment (1976-1985) - became the 51st Battalion, Far North Queensland Regiment
