= Defence (Citizen Military Forces) Act 1943 =

Act of the Parliament of Australia

Parliament of Australia
- Long title: An Act to authorize the Service of Members of the Citizen Military Forces in the Southwestern Pacific Zone for the duration of the present war.
- Citation: No. 2 of 1943
- Enacted: 26 January 1943
- Royal assent: 19 February 1943
- Repealed: 31 December 1950
- Status: Repealed

The Defence (Citizen Military Forces) Act 1943 (Cth) was an Act of the Parliament of Australia, which enabled the Militia, and thus conscripts, to serve overseas in the Pacific.

== Background ==
On 20 October 1939, six weeks after Australia had entered the Second World War, Prime Minister Robert Menzies issued a press statement announcing the reintroduction of compulsory military training with effect from 1 January 1940; with this occurring a decade after the Scullin government had abolished universal military training.

The arrangements required unmarried men turning 21 in the call up period to undertake three months training with the Militia. Under the Defence Act 1903, they could not be compelled to serve outside Australia or its territories. For this purpose, a separate, volunteer force, the Second Australian Imperial Force (AIF) was raised for service overseas.

As Leader of the Opposition and the Australian Labor Party (ALP), John Curtin voiced his opposition in Parliament to the re-introduction of conscription by the Menzies Government and reiterated ALP opposition to compulsory military service overseas. However, as Prime Minister, Curtin sought to amend the ALP platform in order to allow members of the Militia to serve overseas.

There were many reasons for this change in heart: Sir Thomas Blamey, Commander-in-Chief, Australian Military Forces, had transferred large numbers of combat-experienced officers from the Second Australian Imperial Force to the Militia for the purpose of military efficiency; the limits on where conscripts could serve hampered military planning; and there were large numbers of American conscripts arriving in Australia to assist in its defence. Curtin argued that:

The US had saved Australia, and the Government had had a desperate fight to get aid for Australia. He did not want to live those months again. Now the position was that there was a barrage of criticism in Australia and United States was directed at Australia that it would have Americans defend Darwin, but not Australians fight for the Philippines.

Despite rumours at the time, there is no evidence that General Blamey, General MacArthur or the United States government ever recommended any change to the Commonwealth Government but there was vocal criticism of the government's policy in parliament led by Arthur Fadden. On 5 January 1943 the Federal Conference of the ALP passed the following compromise resolution:

That, having regard to the paramount necessity of Australia's defence, the Government be authorised to add to the definition of the territories to which the Defence Act extends the following words: ‘and such other territories in the South-west Pacific Area as the Governor-General proclaims as being territories associated with the defence of Australia’.

Efforts by the opposition to amend the introduced bill to parliament to allow the Governor General to alter the zone by proclamation, and by Labor MPs to add a clause requiring a referendum failed.

== The Act ==
The Act extended the area in which the Militia were obliged to serve, from Australia and its territories to the South-Western Pacific Zone (SWPZ). The SWPZ was a triangle bounded by the equator and the 110th and 159th meridians of longitude. The Act was legislated to have approval for the duration of the war and would lapse within six months of Australia ceasing to be involved in hostilities.

== Legacy ==
The overall military effect of the amendment was not great, as the Militia could already serve in Australian territories and it only extended the limits slightly. In the event, only a few militiamen served outside Australian territory, at Merauke in Dutch Western New Guinea and in the British Solomon Islands.

== See also ==
- Australian Army during World War II

== Bibliography ==
- Hasluck, Paul (1970). "6 - The Political Scene, January 1942 to August 1943" (PDF). Series 4 - Civil. Australia in the War of 1939-1945. Vol. II - The Government and the People, 1942–1945 (1st ed.). Australian War Memorial. ISBN 978-0-642-99366-3.
