= Darwin Mobile Force =

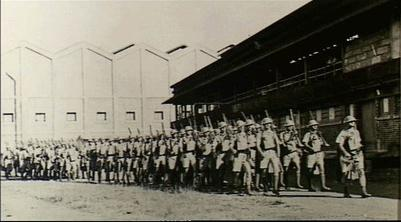
- The Darwin Mobile Force marches in battle order near the Vestey meatworks in April 1939
- Active: 1938–1940
- Country: Australia
- Branch: Australian Army
- Size: 245 men all ranks
- Part of: HQ 7th Military District
- Engagements: Second World War

The Darwin Mobile Force was a mixed force of infantry and artillery raised by the Australian Army prior to the Second World War. It was the first regular infantry field force in the Australian military, although due to legislative restrictions that existed at the time it was established as part of the Royal Australian Artillery. Its formation marked a rare departure from the traditional Australian focus upon part-time citizen forces and is arguably a key moment in the development of a professional standing army. Attached to the 7th Military District, the Darwin Mobile Force were used to garrison the strategic port of Darwin in the Northern Territory, along with 9th Heavy Battery and the 7th Fortress Engineers, RAE, and to provide personnel with training and command experience. The force ceased to exist in August 1940 when its personnel were broken up and sent to other units.

== History ==
The Darwin Mobile Force was formed in response to growing concerns about the potential for war, which had resulted in the Australian government seeking to increase the readiness of the military through the creation of a number of regular army mobile forces to defend strategic locations around the country. Due to the provisions of the Defence Act (1903) which prohibited the establishment of permanent infantry forces, however, it was decided to raise the force as a unit of the Royal Australian Artillery, even though the majority of the force would be infantry. Such was the uniqueness of the force at the time that its establishment received a considerable amount of media attention.

With a total establishment of 12 officers and 233 other ranks, the force consisted of a headquarters wing and reconnaissance group, an artillery troop of 18-pounder guns, a medium machine gun section, a mortar section and a rifle company. The force's commanding officer was Major Alex MacDonald. (Note: Service details may be viewed here: "WW2 Nominal Roll: Alex MacDonald". Commonwealth of Australia. Archived from the original on 4 March 2016.) Recruiting for the force was undertaken in all Australian states and resulted in over 3,000 applications, with preference being given to men who were currently serving in the Militia, although some members were also currently serving in the Permanent Military Force. Applicants were required to be between 18 and 30 years of age and were subject to high standards of medical and dental fitness, and successful recruits were signed on for an engagement of five years, of which two years and nine months was to be spent in Darwin.

While ostensibly the force was to bolster the defences of the strategic port of Darwin—which were at the time defended by the units of the 7th Military District—conceptually its role was much broader than this. Due to the legislative restrictions upon permanent military forces the opportunities for officers in the Permanent Military Force to gain command experience was low, thus upon establishment a large part of the Darwin Mobile Force's role was to provide command and training opportunities, not only to graduates from the Royal Military College, Duntroon, but also to members of the Australian Instructional Corps.

The force came into being on 14 November 1938, concentrating at Liverpool, New South Wales where equipment was issued and training undertaken. Training was completed by February 1939 and the following month the force paraded through the City of Sydney, after which the advance party embarked upon the Marella. A week later the rest of the force sailed upon the Montoro, stopping at Brisbane before continuing on to Darwin.

Following their arrival on 29 March 1939, the troops paraded through Darwin before taking up residence in the abandoned Vestey’s meatworks. Training was continued, including a number of field exercises, but these were punctuated by other tasks including unloading of ships, construction of roads and fixed defences and guard duties. Over time the force’s vehicles and other equipment arrived.

After the outbreak of the Second World War, the government announced the establishment of an all volunteer force for overseas service—the Second Australian Imperial Force—and early in 1940 the Darwin Mobile Force began to be broken up as men volunteered to join the AIF. They moved from Vesteys meatworks to Larrakeyah Barracks and on 20 August 1940 the Darwin Mobile Force was disbanded and the infantry used to form the Darwin Infantry Battalion, under the command of Lieutenant Colonel Philip Cardale. This unit was later renamed the 19th Battalion on 1 November 1941, while the artillery group became the 18th Field Battery, Royal Australian Artillery.

Although the force did not receive any battle honours and ultimately did not see any action during the war, arguably its contribution to Australia’s defence was in the personnel it provided to the Army. The force’s commanding officer, MacDonald, went on to command the 2/16th Battalion in the Syrian campaign, and then later the Jungle Warfare Centre at Canungra, Queensland. Of the officers who served in the Darwin Mobile Force, two rose to general officer rank, (Note: Francis Hassett and R.L Hughes.) while four reached brigadier (Note: H.G Bates, N.L Currie, Maurice Austin and D.R. Jackson.) and two the rank of colonel. Of the other ranks that served, over 100 were eventually commissioned as officers, while a similar number became warrant officers or senior non commissioned officers in the AIF.

== Notes ==
Footnotes

Citations
