= Land Warfare Centre (Australia) =

Australian Army training establishment

- Active: 1942–46; 1954–present
- Country: Australia
- Branch: Australian Army
- Type: Training Establishment
- Role: All corps officer and NCO training
- Part of: Royal Military College of Australia

Commanders
- Notable commanders: Ted Serong

Insignia
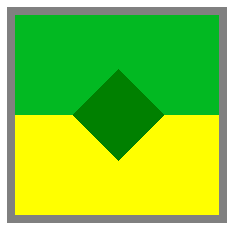
- Unit Colour Patch

The Land Warfare Centre (LWC) is an Australian Army training establishment that is responsible for the provision of promotion courses to commissioned and non commissioned officers (NCOs) in an "all corps" setting. It was originally established during World War II at Canungra, Queensland, as the Jungle Training Centre to prepare troops for combat in the South West Pacific Area. During the 1950s and 1960s, the centre fulfilled a similar role, but since then has evolved to provide a broader spectrum of training courses with detachments at a number of bases across Australia.

== Structure ==
Under the higher Royal Military College of Australia formation, LWC has its headquarters at Canungra, Queensland, and consists of a number of wings, namely: Officer Training Wing (OTW), the Warrant and Non Commissioned Officer Academy (WONCO) and Education Wing. OTW is located at Kokoda Barracks at Canungra, while Education Wing is headquartered at Simpson Barracks in Melbourne. Headquarters WONCO is co-located with LWC headquarters, but has detachments spread throughout Australia at RAAF Edinburgh, Steele Barracks, Simpson Barracks, Gallipoli Barracks, Lavarack Barracks, and Robertson Barracks. Education Wing has small detachments at each of these locations, and also at Leeuwin Barracks in Western Australia.

== History ==
The training centre draws its lineage from the Jungle Training Centre that was formed in November 1942 in response to the requirement to train troops for jungle combat in the South West Pacific Area during World War II. Under the command of Colonel Alex MacDonald, who had previously commanded the Darwin Mobile Force, the centre grew out of the Guerilla Warfare School that had been established earlier at Foster, Victoria. Located in the Gold Coast hinterland below the Beechmont plateau that stretches towards Tamborine Mountain, the establishment was located amidst thick rainforest and steep, razor-back country. Staffed by instructors that had experienced combat – mostly in the Middle East, initially, but then in New Guinea as the war progressed – upon creation the centre consisted of a number of detachments including the Reinforcement Training Centre, the Independent Company Training Centre and the Tactical School. As the demand for specialised jungle warfare training grew with Australia's increased involvement in the Pacific, the centre was expanded until it consisted of about 2,000 trainees organised into eight training companies; each week a total of 500 personnel marched out to join the infantry battalions fighting in the New Guinea campaign having completed a four-week course. In addition, the Commando Training Battalion was formed to provide reinforcements for the Australian commando units, while an officer training wing focused upon delivering specialised platoon-level training for officers over the course of a six-week program. After May 1943, the centre began to contract as its need declined, although it continued to train large numbers of soldiers under experienced senior instructors such as Major Harry Harcourt. It was finally disbanded in 1946 following the conclusion of hostilities.

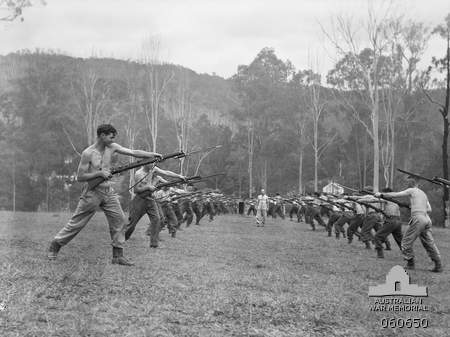
Australian soldiers undertaking bayonet training at Canungra, November 1943

The mid-1950s saw the Australian Army deployed to a number of theatres in Southeast Asia in response to the threat of Communism and as a result the Jungle Training Centre was re-raised in 1954. At that time the centre's facilities were expanded to over 7,700 acres (3,100 ha) and its subunits consisted of an officer and NCO training unit, a collective pre-deployment training unit and a doctrine wing. Colonel Ted Serong took over command of the centre in 1955 and instructors included officers who had gained considerable experience during World War II; these included Lieutenant Colonel George Warfe, who had commanded a commando company and infantry battalion during the war and who was appointed to the role of Chief Instructor. Major Bernard O'Dowd, who had served in Korea, took over as Senior Instructor. Using the skills of these men, the units of the Royal Australian Regiment were prepared for tours of Malaya and Borneo. The first unit to receive training was the 2nd Battalion, Royal Australian Regiment, which cycled through Canungra in company lots starting in early 1955. In 1960, the centre's remit was expanded to include the provision of training on promotion courses for officers of all corps in the Army. In 1964, the centre came under the command of Colonel Stuart Clarence Graham. Following the commitment of Australian personnel to South Vietnam, the centre ramped up its training program as 10,000 soldiers were rotated through Canungra each year as part of the pre-deployment training each battalion had to complete before undertaking its tour of duty. As a part of this, on 4 January 1966, a demonstration platoon was raised at Canungra. It was later redesignated as HQ 1st Division Defence Company. Training during this time consisted of three weeks of physical and mental hardening through a battery of obstacle courses and battle inoculation ranges.

Following the conclusion of Australia's involvement in the war in 1972, the Australian Army underwent a period of re-organisation that saw it move towards an "all volunteer" force. As a part of this restructure, in December that year the Australian government decided to reduce the nine regular infantry battalions to five, with a sixth battalion being established at Canungra at company strength, where it would fulfil the role of demonstration company before eventually being expanded into a full battalion. A lack of manpower, however, forced the disbandment of this company in 1973. The requirement for an opposing force remained, though, and so the 10th Independent Rifle Company, Royal Australian Regiment (10 IRC) was raised on 23 May 1974, with an establishment of 60 personnel organised into two platoons. By the mid-1970s the focus of Australia's doctrine had moved away from "forward defence" in Southeast Asia towards the "defence of Australia" and, as a result, in June 1975 the Jungle Training Centre was renamed the "Land Warfare Centre".

In 1980, the raising of the Operational Deployment Force, which required a battalion of the 3rd Task Force to be maintained at high readiness for deployment to the South West Pacific or Southeast Asia year-round, meant that the Army once again needed to develop skills necessary to operate in tropical or jungle conditions. As a result, a renewed jungle warfare training program was established. Urban development around Canungra had encroached upon the training area, though, so the decision was made to situate this training in a new establishment called the 1st Division Tropical Training Centre (later redesignated to Battle School), at Tully, Queensland. The Land Warfare Centre therefore continued to focus on individual training rather than collective training and this in part led, in March 1980, to the reduction of LWC's demonstration force, the 10th Independent Rifle Company, to just one platoon of 40 men as its manpower was redirected to meet shortages in the 3rd Task Force.

Throughout the early to late 1990s, the centre experienced a period of flux. 10 IRC was disbanded and the centre underwent a number of further name changes; in 1998 it adopted the designation as the "Army All-Corps Promotions Training Centre" in line with similar designations being used across Training Command, a very short lived designation as in 1999 it adopted the designation of the "Army Promotion Training Centre". Late the following year, as a result of a re-organisation of its higher formation – Training Command – the centre adopted the title of "Headquarters Regional Training Centres"; in line with this eight Regional Training Centres were raised. Formed from the old Training Groups, they were established in South Queensland, North Queensland, the Northern Territory, Western Australia, South Australia, Tasmania, Victoria and New South Wales. These became known as regional Wings of LWC in 2005. By 1 January 2009, the Tasmanian Wing had closed, as had the Western Australia Wing, with responsibility for both being passed to the South Australian Wing.

In 2012, LWC became a subordinate unit of the Royal Military College of Australia formation and was training about 3,000 personnel each year across a suite of courses delivered to junior and senior non commissioned and junior commissioned officers. It also supports the Army Aboriginal Community Assistance Program, detaching officers in command, leadership and management roles to implement the project's training serials.
