= Gordon Grimsley King =

Australian Army officer

Gordon Grimsley King, DSO
- Born: 22 September 1918; Sydney, New South Wales
- Died: 2009 (aged 90–91)
- Military career
- Allegiance: Australia
- Branch: Australian Army
- Service years: 1938–1945; 1948–c. 1956
- Rank: Lieutenant Colonel
- Commands: Sydney University Regiment; 2/6th Independent Company
- Conflicts: Second World War; New Guinea campaign; Borneo campaign
- Awards: Distinguished Service Order

Lieutenant Colonel Gordon Grimsley King, DSO (22 September 1918 – 2009) was an officer of the Australian Army during the Second World War.

== Early life ==
Gordon was born in Sydney on 22 September 1918, the son of Ralph King, and Myra, née Grimsley. He attended Knox Grammar School, where he was active in the cadet unit. Gordon studied architecture at the University of Sydney. In 1938, he joined the Citizens Military Force serving as a part-time soldier in the 17th Battalion and in early 1941 volunteered for overseas service, enlisting in the 2nd Australian Imperial Force.

== Second World War ==
Gordon became an instructor at the Guerilla Warfare School at Tidal River, Victoria, in 1941 and trained the newly raised 2/6th Independent Company in May 1942 and was posted to New Guinea as second in command of the company in August 1942. The 2/6th was sent to the Kokoda Track and placed under the command of the 7th Division's headquarters. On 28 August 1942, the company moved up to Mount Eirama where they were employed as the divisional reserve. As the situation along the track continued to worsen, the 2/6th moved to cover the Goldie River Valley in order to block any Japanese outflanking manoeuvres.

Long distance patrols were undertaken between 6 September and 12 October 1942 to cover wider lines of possible enemy approach through the Yodda Valley, the jungle tracks around Esau Creek and Brown River and along Engineer Road in support of Honner Force. The purpose of these patrols was to obtain topographical information regarding the tracks in the area which might be used by Australian forces to outflank the enemy, as well as to provide early warning of any enemy infiltration attempts. In this vane, the patrols varied in size and duration, ranging from four or five men to 150 and from five to six days up to months. In some cases they acted as independent, long-range patrols, while others were in close contact with regular formations.

On 14 October 1942, elements (Note: A and D Patrols were still in the Kokoda area at this time, as well as Y Patrol which was heading to Yodda River. As such, just over 100 men arrived at Wanigela at this time. See Trigellis-Smith 1992, p. 82.) of the 2/6th were flown from 14-Mile Drome across the mountains to Wanigela Airfield, Wangiela. From Wanigela the company moved to Pongani. With the offensive started in the Battle of Buna-Gona, the 2/6th patrolled in front of the United States Army's 1st Battalion, 126th Infantry Regiment, along the coast from Pongani to Buna. Arriving at the front line at Buna on 20 November 1942, the 2/6th was engaged in the heavy fighting around the airfield named New Strip until the early December 1942 during which time they were employed mainly in a traditional infantry role. In mid-December, the 2/6th was withdrawn to Soputa and then Port Moresby, where they spent Christmas prior to returning to Australia for re-organisation and refurbishment.

He returned with the 2/6th to Australia in March 1943 and after some leave, re-assembled at the Army's Jungle Warfare Centre at Canungra, Queensland. As part of the Army-wide re-organisation that was being undertaken, the 2/6th Independent Company became known as the 2/6th Commando Squadron.

The 2/6th sailed from Townsville for Port Moresby in August 1943, and then, in the middle of September, with Gordon in command, it was flown to an area just west of the Leron River, in the Markham Valley for the upcoming Markham–Ramu campaign. Attached to the 7th Division, the squadron provided flank protection during the campaign, mainly carrying out reconnaissance and long range patrols, although they were also used to capture and hold ground in advance of the main formation at times. During the Battle of Kaiapit, on 19–20 September 1943, Gordon was wounded in the leg, however he continued to lead his men against overwhelming odds and was later awarded the Distinguished Service Order for his actions. After recovering from his wounds, he led his men and continued to provide flank protection for the 7th Division during its advance to Shaggy Ridge. He was promoted to major in December 1943, and led the company until July 1945, including during the early stages of the battle of Balikpapan. He was discharged from the Army in September 1945.

== Later life ==
After the war, Gordon completed his architectural degree and practised as an architect until he joined his father's stockbroking firm of Ralph W. King and Yuill as a partner in 1955. He married Jeannette Poate in 1949. Gordon continued his affiliation with the Army, joining the 17/18th Battalion, the North Shore Regiment, which was formed as part of the Citizens Military Force in 1948. He was appointed the commanding officer of the Sydney University Regiment in 1954. The regiment was in camp at Singleton, New South Wales, when the 1955 Hunter Valley floods occurred, and participated in relief and cleanup efforts. Following an explosion and fire in the Pokolbin State Forest in 1956, King grabbed his poncho and wrapped a sergeant whose clothes were on fire in it, helping to save his life.

Gordon retired from his work commitments in 1978, although he remained a member of the Palm Beach Surf Life Saving Club until his death. He also served for 20 years as a director of The Smith Family, and was on the committee of the Australian Club. During his 90th birthday celebrations he revisited Kokoda, Mission Hill and Kaiapit and unveiled a plaque at Kokoda in commemoration of the 2/6th Commando Squadron. Gordon King died in 2009 and was survived by Jeannette and his children Robert, Vivian, Edwina and Marisa.

== Notes ==
Footnotes

Citations
