= Battle of Dumpu =

1943 conflict in New Guinea

- Part of the Markham, Ramu and Finisterre campaigns, World War II
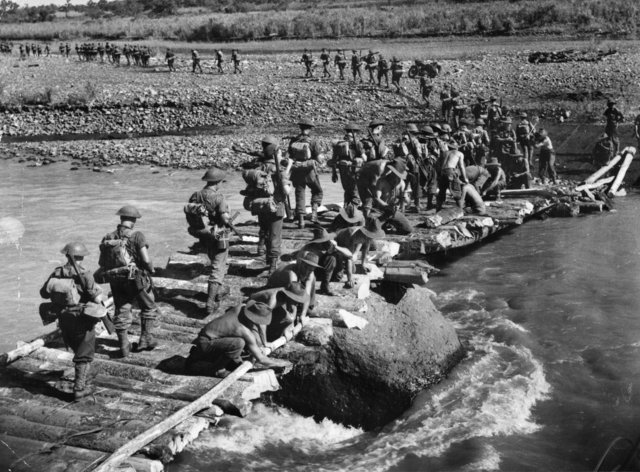
- Australian troops cross a bridge over the 19-kilometre-per-hour (10 kn) Gusap River on 25 October 1943
Date	22 September – 4 October 1943
Location	Dumpu, Territory of New Guinea
Result	Allied victory

Belligerents
Australia; United States	Japan

Commanders and leaders
(Australia) Ivan Dougherty	(Empire of Japan) Masutaro Nakai

Units involved
21st Brigade	78th Infantry Regiment

Casualties and losses
5 dead 8 wounded 119 sick	Unknown

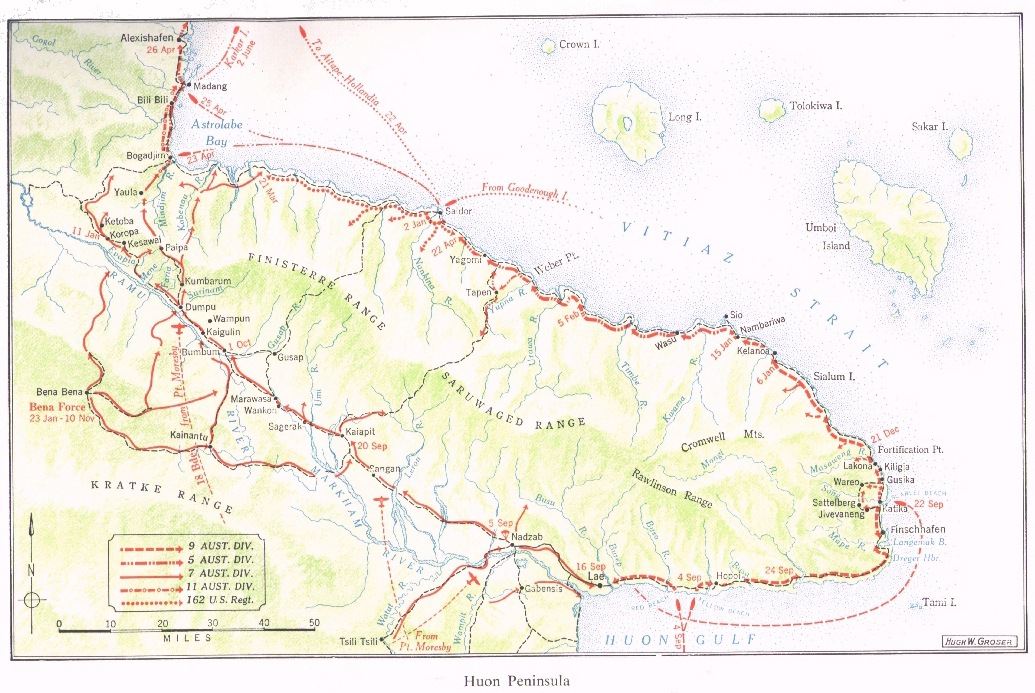
Operations on the Huon Peninsula 1943–44

The Battle of Dumpu was an action fought in September and October 1943 between Australian and Japanese forces in New Guinea during the Markham, Ramu and Finisterre campaigns of World War II. After the Battle of Kaiapit on 20 September 1943, in which the 2/6th Independent Company won a victory against a numerically superior Japanese force, Ivan Dougherty's 21st Infantry Brigade of the 7th Division advanced from Kaiapit to Dumpu in the Ramu Valley.

The 21st Infantry Brigade was opposed by Major General Masutaro Nakai's Nakai Detachment, which consisted of the 78th Infantry Regiment and one company of the 80th Infantry Regiment, both from the 20th Division. There was a series of minor actions, but the Australian advance was not delayed, and Dumpu was captured as planned.

During the entire advance, the Australian and American forces in the Ramu Valley were supplied by air. The capture of the Ramu Valley allowed a forward airbase to be developed at Gusap.

== Background ==
=== Geography ===
The Markham Valley is part of a flat, elongated depression varying from 8 to 32 kilometres (5.0 to 19.9 mi) wide that cuts through the otherwise mountainous terrain of the interior of New Guinea, running from the mouth of the Markham River near the port of Lae, to that of the Ramu River some 600 kilometres (370 mi) away. The two rivers flow in opposite directions, separated by an invisible divide about 130 kilometres (81 mi) from Lae. The area is flat and suitable for airstrips, although it is intercut by many tributaries of the two main rivers. The area around the divide was the largest area in New Guinea bereft of forest cover, and was passable by vehicles. Between the Ramu Valley and Madang lay the rugged and aptly named Finisterre Ranges.

=== Military situation ===
In the wake of the landing at Nadzab on 5 September 1943, and the subsequent capture of Lae on 16 September, Major General George Alan Vasey's 7th Division moved on to the next task assigned by the Commander in Chief, South West Pacific Area, General Douglas MacArthur, in the June 1943 directive that outlined Operation Cartwheel. This entailed protecting the area it had secured around Nadzab to allow airfields to be developed there, along with the existing airfields around Goroka and Bena Bena.

At the Battle of Kaiapit on 20 September, the 2/6th Independent Company won a stunning victory against a numerically superior Japanese force. With the Japanese off-balance, Vasey informed his superior, Lieutenant General Sir Edmund Herring, the commander of I Corps, of his intention to advance up the Markham Valley to the Ramu Valley, down the Ramu Valley to Marawasa, and finally to Dumpu. There was some debate amongst the air and engineer generals about the relative merits of airfield sites around Kaiapit and Marasawa, but Vasey intended to seize them all in any case.

Australian intelligence correctly identified the opposing Japanese forces as belonging to 78th Infantry Regiment, along with one company of the 80th Infantry Regiment, both from the 20th Division. This was known to the Japanese as the Nakai Detachment, after its commander, Major General Masutaro Nakai. In contrast, the Japanese did not identify the Australians as belonging to the 7th Division.

At Kaiapit, Brigadier Ivan Dougherty, the commander of the 21st Infantry Brigade, had the 2/16th Infantry Battalion, the 2/6 Independent Company and B Company, Papuan Infantry Battalion. While it was possible that the Australian force at Kaiapit under could be facing the entire Japanese 20th Division, Dougherty did not think that the Japanese could support such a large force in the upper Markham Valley. Lieutenant Colonel W. T. Robertson, Vasey's GSO1, told Dougherty that he had until 4 October to reach Dumpu, as no fighter cover would be available from 10 to 20 October, and therefore there would be no air transport operations to resupply him. A message from Vasey received at 00:50 on 23 September ordered Dougherty not to make "any further movement in strength".

The rebuff at Kaiapit and the landing at Finschhafen on 22 September caused Lieutenant General Hatazō Adachi, the commander of the Japanese Eighteenth Army (and therefore Herring's opposite number) to change his plans. He had originally intended that the 51st Division would retire from Lae along the southern slopes of the Finisterre Range, through Kaiapit, and thence into the upper Ramu Valley; but Vasey had anticipated this, and had blocked the route. The 51st Division's commander, Lieutenant General Hidemitsu Nakano, then decided to withdraw over the steep and rugged Saruwaged Range. This meant that the Nakai Detachment was not covering the 51st Division's withdrawal, and that there was no need to recapture Kaiapit. On 23 September, Adachi therefore ordered Nakai to withdraw to Dumpu, while the rest of the 20th Division moved against Finschhafen.

== Battle ==
=== Sagerak ===
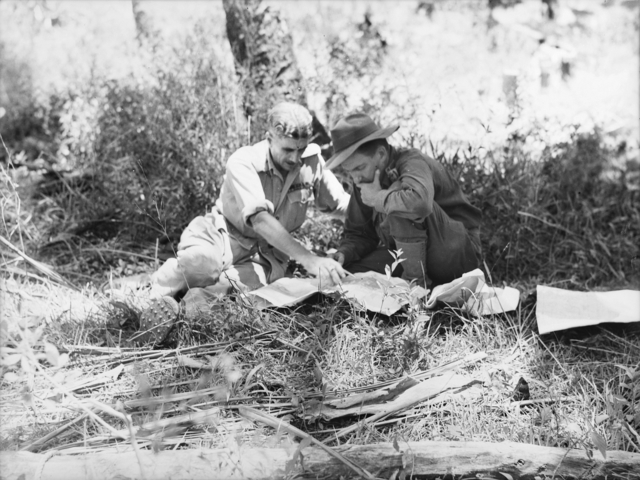
Kaiapit, New Guinea, 25 September 1943. Vasey (left) and Dougherty discuss battle plans

Lieutenant Colonel F. H. Sublet's 2/16th Infantry Battalion, a unit from Western Australia, arrived at Kaiapit on 22 September. It set out at 15:00 that afternoon, crossing the Maniang River, which had a series of channels, extending across 1,800 metres (2,000 yd). Its patrols attempted to locate the Japanese, as did aircraft from No. 4 Squadron RAAF. Only one saw any, the 12 Platoon, under Lieutenant J. R. Walder, which spotted three Japanese soldiers on the far side of the Umi River who fled when fired upon. Walder's 12 Platoon, and 17 Platoon under Captain K. McCullough, crossed the Umi, which was about 46 metres (50 yd) wide, up to 1.68 metres (5 ft 6 in) deep at the crossing point, and swift-flowing, and headed for Sagerak.

The 2/27th Infantry Battalion, a South Australian unit under the command of Lieutenant Colonel J. A. Bishop, arrived at Kaiapit on the morning of 23 September, having flown directly from Jacksons and Wards at Port Moresby in 45 USAAF C-47 transport aircraft, escorted by P-47 Thunderbolt, P-38 Lightning and P-39 Airacobra fighters. The first C-47 arrived at Kaiapit at 09:00 and the last at 10:50. Each took about ten minutes to unload all its troops and stores. The 2/27th took over the defence of Kaiapit from the 2/6th Independent Company. No aircraft arrived on 24 September, leaving Dougherty without the 2/14th Infantry Battalion, which was still back at Nadzab, and with only the rations and ammunition that the 2/16th and 2/27th had brought with them.

The pioneer platoon of the 2/16th strung a rope across the Umi River, allowing the heavily equipped diggers of B and C Companies to cross the fast-flowing torrent. They were across by 12:30, but the entire 2/16th did not complete the crossing until 20:00. On the other side, contact was made with Japanese units, and 12 Platoon came under light machine gun fire, but drove the Japanese off with its 2-inch mortars. When 17 Platoon was engaged by light machine guns, it used its 2-inch mortars to lay smoke, allowing it to withdraw. By 14:40, the leading platoon, 10 Platoon under Lieutenant W. J. Duncan, was overlooking Sagerak, but Duncan was wounded by a sniper at 17:00. Sublet ordered B Company to halt on the high ground, with the intent of attacking Sagerak the next day.

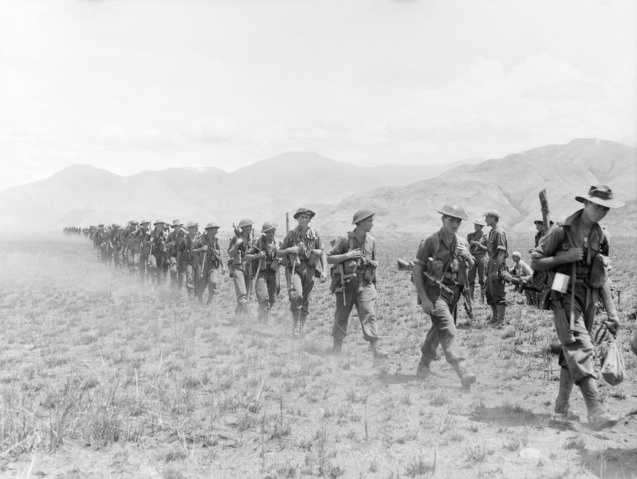
2/27th Infantry Battalion in the Ramu Valley on 5 October 1943

At 20:30, just a half-hour after it had completed the crossing of the Umi, the 2/16th received orders from Dougherty to pull back. With considerable lack of enthusiasm, the 2/16th re-crossed the Umi, this time in the dark. Re-crossing commenced at 03:00 and was completed by 08:00. Lieutenant R. G. Crombie's 11 Platoon was left behind on the high ground overlooking Sagerak. It entered Sagerak that morning, and found it deserted. About 16 Japanese soldiers fled when upon their approach, leaving behind their documents, medical stores and equipment. Lieutenant Everette E. Frazier, an American aviation engineer, pegged out a landing strip nearby and had it ready to receive C-47s in four hours.

Vasey flew into Kaiapit to talk to Dougherty. He explained that the reason for halting the 2/16th was an appreciation that Adachi would persist with his original plan, known to the Australians through documents captured at Kaiapit, even though it had been overtaken by events. Vasey believed that the open area between the Umi and Kaiapit would be an excellent place to destroy the Japanese force, should it choose to attack. He therefore proposed to halt for a while, reinforcing the position at Kaiapit with Brigadier Kenneth Eather's 25th Infantry Brigade rather than displacing it forward as originally intended. Dougherty flew over the area in a Douglas SBD Dauntless, and concurred with Vasey's assessment of the ground, although not with his appreciation of the enemy's intent.

=== Gusap ===
The 2/14th Infantry Battalion, a Victorian unit, along with the 54th Battery of the 2/4th Field Regiment, finally flew in to Kaiapit from Nadzab on 25 September, but the first elements of the 25th Infantry Brigade did not arrive for another two days. Part of the problem was that the Fifth Air Force restricted landings at Kaiapit to between 09:00 and 15:30 the previous day in order to conserve fighters. Vasey met with Lieutenant Generals Sir Iven Mackay (the commander of New Guinea Force), Edmund Herring, and George C. Kenney (the commander of Allied Air Forces), Major General Frank Berryman (Mackay's chief of staff) and Vice Admiral Arthur S. Carpender (the commander of Allied Naval Forces) in Port Moresby on 26 September. Vasey was informed that the construction of the Markham Valley Road from Lae to Nadzab and operations around Finschhafen had priority, and his 18th Infantry Brigade would not be flown in except in the event of an emergency. The pause allowed a native labour force to be collected at Kaiapit. Some 300 were flown in from Nadzab, and the Australian New Guinea Administrative Unit (ANGAU) hired local labour to bring the total labour force to about 600. (Note: ANGAU was the Australian Army unit responsible for civil affairs in the Territory of Papua and the mandated Territory of New Guinea. It hired and controlled local labour and advised commanders on matters peculiar to New Guinea.)

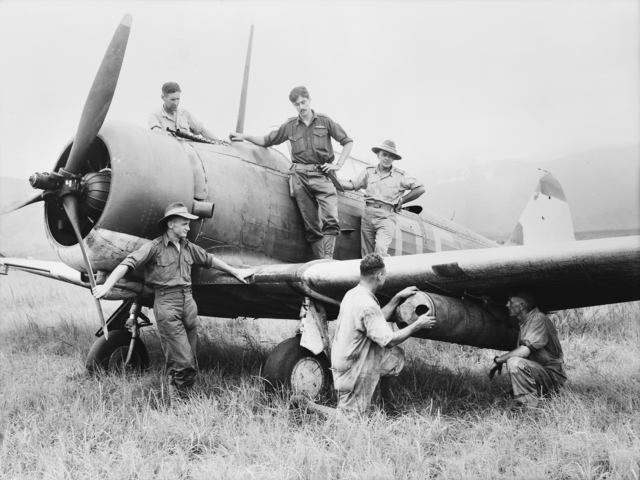
Flying Officer R.D. Lee-Warner with members of No. 4 Squadron RAAF's ground staff who are attaching containers to the bomb racks on a CAC Wirraway at Gusap.

There was mounting evidence that the Japanese were retreating and not advancing. On 26 September, Crombie reported that Rumu was unoccupied. The following day, patrols from the 2/6th Independent Company and B Company, Papuan Infantry Battalion, reported that Narawapum was also deserted. That evening, Vasey signalled Dougherty, authorising an advance on Marawasa "with all speed". The 21st Infantry Brigade set out accompanied by the Papuan company, and detachments of the 2/6th Field Ambulance and 2/4th Field Regiment. Six jeeps hauled rations, four carried the brigade headquarters and signals, three brought the 2/6th Field Ambulance, and two towed 25 pounders.

On 28 September, two companies of the 2/16th crossed the Umi. After dusk, the rest of the 21st Infantry Brigade followed, crossing in five rubber rafts. The jeeps and light guns were dragged across the Umi, leaving three behind to form a shuttle service that moved stores from Kaiapit. They were taken across the river and thence to a dump at Sagarak. By the morning of 30 September, all the stores were across the river. The track became impassable about 3.2 kilometres (2 mi) beyond Sagerak, requiring some work to be done to improve it. The airstrip at Sagerak was put to use, with four more jeeps and trailers, and some supplies flown in. Vasey also flew in, bringing new, written orders for an advance on Gusap. By this time, Herring knew that the rest of the Japanese 20th Division was on the Rai Coast and not in the Marawasa area, so Vasey was opposed only by its 78th Infantry Regiment.

Bena Bena was garrisoned by the 2/2nd and 2/7th Independent Companies. These units patrolled ahead of the 21st Infantry Brigade's advance. On 28 September, a heavily armed patrol from the 2/2nd Independent Company under Captain D. St A. Dexter ambushed about 60 Japanese soldiers near Kesawai in the Ramu Valley, inflicting severe casualties on the Japanese.

Although native porters were engaged to bring rations forward to the troops, the 2/16th and 2/27th advanced so fast on 1 October that stores had to be dropped by air. The drop was made at 19:00 but owing to poor light, the long grass and inadequate marking of the drop zone, only half the stores were retrieved. The following day they reached the juncture of the Ramu and Gusap Rivers.

=== Dumpu ===
Dougherty rested his men on 3 October (which was a Sunday). The men relaxed and swam in the Ramu and Gusap Rivers. Patrols were sent out, however. One patrol from the 2/16th under Lieutenant L. D. Bremner was ambushed near village of Namaput, with one Australian being killed. The patrol attacked the village and killed seven Japanese making for the nearby foothills. The patrol then came under heavy fire itself, and had to withdraw back to the village. Three Australians were wounded, including Bremner, one fatally; 14 Japanese soldiers were killed.

The pause gave time for the administrative elements to catch up. The road had held up progress on 1 October due to the need to bridge a stream at Marawassa. It was then found that the road on the far side was impassable, so a bypass was made, allowing them to move to an area near Arafagan Creek, on the banks of the Ramu River. Under Frazier's supervision, the 2/27th established an airstrip nearby. An air supply drop was made there on the afternoon of 2 October.

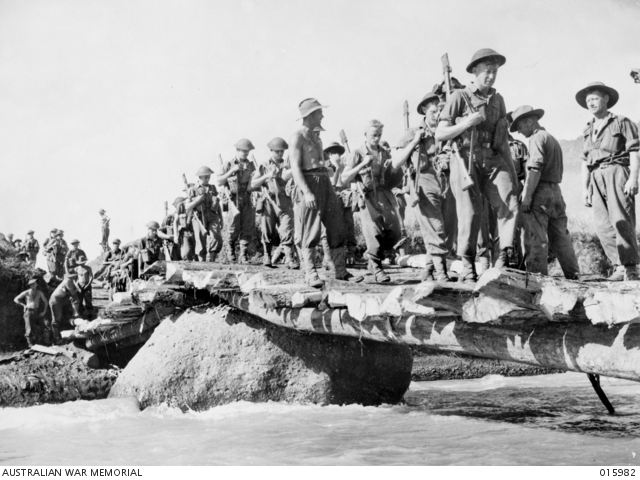
Ramu Valley, New Guinea. 26 October 1943. Australian troops in their victorious push along the Markham and Ramu valleys cross a bridge over the 19 kilometres per hour (10 kn) Gusap River. This bridge was built in a few hours.

The 21st Infantry Brigade set out again on 4 October, with Lieutenant Colonel Ralph Honner's 2/14th heading for Wampun while the 2/16th advanced on Dumpu, crossing the Gusap on a bridge that had been built the previous day. The 21st Infantry Brigade headquarters moved to Kaigulan 2. (Note: Where a group of villages in New Guinea had a name, the individual villages that comprised them were given numbers to distinguish them.) The 2/6th Field Ambulance opened a dressing station there. A Details Issue Depot (DID) was established to the west of the Warris River, from which rations were issued.

The 2/14th reached an unoccupied Wampun at 14:00. Honner found that the native porters accompanying his battalion had no water, and were therefore not only thirsty, but hungry as well, as they could not cook their rice rations. If no water could be found in the vicinity, he would have to arrange for water to be sent by jeep from Kaigulan 2, or else move the whole battalion on to the next day's objective.

Honner set out with Sergeant T. G. Pryor and three privates to see if he could find water in A Company's area around Koram. At around 15:00, they came across a banana plantation, and saw troops moving around in it. They assumed that they were from A Company, but when they approached they were fired on, and Honner and Pryor were both wounded. Pryor, wounded in the throat and chest, attempted to drag Honner, who was wounded in the thigh and could not move easily, but Honner ordered him to return to get help. Private W. H. G. Bennett remained to protect Honner while the other two privates accompanied Pryor. Honner managed to crawl 230 metres (250 yd) to some long kunai grass and hide there. The Japanese sent out patrols to find the two men, and they fired into the kunai grass where he was hiding, wounding him again, this time in the left hand. Bennett was about to make a one-man attack on the Japanese when the patrols withdrew and returned to the banana plantation.

Pryor reached D Company, whose commander, Captain G. O. O'Day, immediately set out with Lieutenant A. R. Avery's 16 Platoon. Avery found Bennett and Honner, who was covered in blood and black ants. Honner refused to be carried out under fire, as this might endanger the stretcher bearers. Instead, he used Avery's radio to arrange an attack on the banana plantation by A, C and D Companies, which was delivered at 18:00. While the fighting was going on, the stretcher bearers tended to Honner's wounds, and carried him back. Seven Australians were wounded in the action, including Honner, who was flown out from Gusap the next day; 26 Japanese soldiers were killed, and one, wounded, was taken prisoner. Water was found in the A Company area, although some was also sent forward by jeep. The wounded, including Honner, were taken to the dressing station at Kaigulan 2 by jeep. The last one did not arrive until after midnight.

Meanwhile, the main body of the 2/16th Infantry Battalion had crossed the Surinam River by 15:15. Lieutenant J. Scott's 18 Platoon scouted towards Dumpu, but reported at 16:40 that it was still occupied. Major W. G. Symington then brought the rest of D Company forward for an attack on the village. There was no opposition, although one Japanese straggler was killed. They found food, clothing and ammunition, and, in the latrines, evidence of dysentery among the Japanese troops. D Company had Japanese rice and tinned fish for its evening meal.

== Aftermath ==
Despite various obstacles, the 21st Infantry Brigade advanced from Kaiapit to Dumpu, which it had captured on the original target date. The Japanese had not delayed it, nor relieved the pressure on the 51st Division. Japanese plans for capturing Bena Bena had to be permanently shelved. An airstrip was developed at Dumpu, which would assume great importance in the logistical support of the subsequent fighting in the Finisterres. Between 15 September and 5 October, the 21st Infantry Brigade reported 5 dead and 8 wounded. Another 34 men were evacuated sick with malaria, and 85 with fever, mostly scrub typhus. By 1 November, however, another 318 were evacuated with malaria and 327 with fever, many of whom had contracted it in this campaign.

After some debate, the engineers decided to build an advanced base for two fighter groups and a medium bombardment group near the junction of the Ramu and Gusap Rivers, at a site called Gusap. The US 872nd Airborne Engineer Aviation Battalion was flown in to develop it. This unit had air-portable equipment for just such a mission. With the exception of the 2 1/2-ton trucks, 3 1/2-ton carryalls and D4 tractors, which made the trek overland, all equipment was flown in by C-47s. Initially the engineers attempted to improve the existing strip, which they called No. 1, but this site was found unsuitable for large volumes of traffic, so another site was selected 1.6 kilometres (1 mi) away, which became No. 2. This location proved suitable for more airstrips. To construct an all-weather strip, the US 871st Airborne Engineer Aviation Battalion was flown in from Nadzab. The all-weather strip was completed by January 1944, at which time the two battalions were joined by a third, the US 875th Airborne Engineer Aviation Battalion. Machine gunners from the 6th Machine Gun Battalion were deployed to the airfield in a defensive role.

The US 49th Fighter Group's 8th Fighter Squadron, equipped with P-47s, moved to Gusap on 29 October, followed by the P-40s of the 7th Fighter Squadron on 16 November, and the P-47s of the 9th Fighter Squadron on 16 December. The 35th Fighter Group's 39th Fighter Squadron and 41st Fighter Squadron, also equipped with P-47s, followed on 27 and 31 January 1944. The A-20s of the 312th Bombardment Group joined them in December and January. The base at Gusap "paid for itself many times over in the quantity of Japanese aircraft, equipment and personnel destroyed by Allied attack missions projected from it".
