= 2/6th Commando Squadron (Australia) =

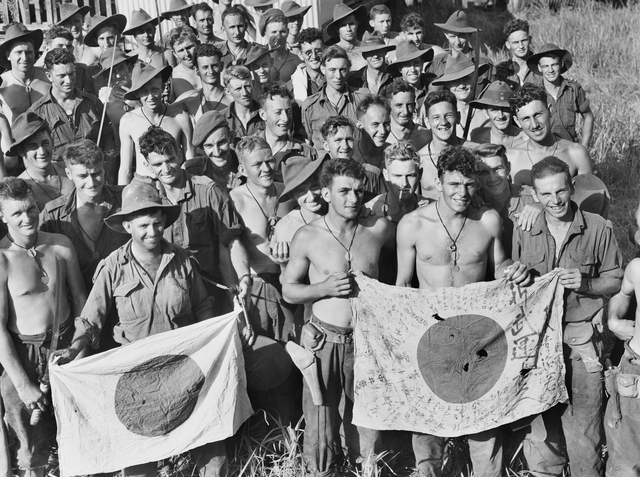
- Members of the 2/6th display Japanese flags captured during the Battle of Kaiapit
- Active: 1942–1946
- Country: Australia
- Branch: Australian Army
- Type: Commando
- Role: Reconnaissance and long range patrols
- Size: 20 officers and 275 men
- Part of: 2/7th Cavalry (Commando) Regiment (HQ), attached to 25th Brigade, 7th Division
- Nickname: Purple Devils
- Engagements: Second World War: Kokoda Track; Buna–Gona; Markham–Ramu; Borneo

Commanders
- Notable commanders: Harry Harcourt

Insignia
- Unit colour patch

The 2/6th Commando Squadron was one of 12 independent companies or commando squadrons raised by the Australian Army during the Second World War. Raised in May 1942 as the 2/6th Independent Company, the 2/6th's main role was to conduct irregular type warfare including small scale raiding, sabotage, long-range patrolling and reconnaissance operations rather than the traditional commando type direct action operations. As such, for the most part the unit conducted operations in small groups operating inside enemy territory, or out in front of larger friendly forces. Between 1942 and 1945, the 2/6th undertook four major campaigns during the war—Kokoda, Buna, Markham–Ramu and Borneo—and was involved in arguably one of the most spectacular small unit actions of the war during the Battle of Kaiapit. The unit was disbanded in January 1946, following the cessation of hostilities in the Pacific.

== History ==
=== Formation and training, 1942 ===
The 2/6th Independent Company was formed in May 1942 at the Guerrilla Warfare School at No. 7 Infantry Training Centre at Tidal River, on Wilsons Promontory in Victoria, in response to recommendations made by the British Military Mission in Australia, headed by Lieutenant Colonel J.C Mawhood.

The company was formed from volunteers from all branches of the Army, and like all of the Independent Companies, it was organised under the philosophy that it had to be a self-sufficient force. As such, it was to be a complete and powerful organisation with its own organic signals, engineering, transport, quartermaster and medical support. The company had a strength of 20 officers and 275 men (larger than a typical infantry company) and was divided into a headquarters and three platoons, with each platoon consisting of 75 men, commanded by a captain, with three sections below that, each commanded by a lieutenant. As firepower was deemed to be an essential element of the company's ability to conduct successful operations within the context as a raiding force, there was an abundance of automatic and section support weapons, including 0.303 Lee–Enfield sniper rifles (SMLEs), Bren light machine guns (LMGs), 2-inch mortars and Thompson and Owen submachine guns, to the extent that in battle each platoon could provide a level of firepower equivalent to that of an infantry company.

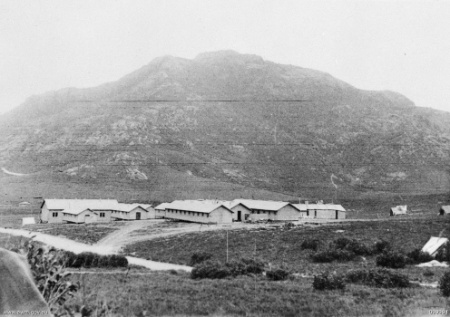
View over Foster training camp, Guerrilla Warfare School, towards Mount Oberon. Mount Oberon was used by members of the independent companies as part of their physical training course. (AWM photo)

The terrain surrounding the training area at Wilsons Promontory consisted of a number of high, rugged and heavily wooded mountains, swift streams and swamps. It was considered ideal for the six-week training course that the first members of the 2/6th had to endure before they were deployed operationally. Initially training stores were scarce, particularly signalling and engineering stores, and as such there was at first a large focus upon physical training. Training was conducted six days and five nights a week and it was a long, gruelling course. As a result, after the first week, 32 men from the initial intake of 300 were removed from training as being unsuitable.

On 6 June 1942, Major Harry Harcourt assumed command of the company. An Englishman by birth, but a naturalised Australian, he had had considerable experience serving with the British Army in the First World War, in the Russian Civil War and in India before he had settled in Tasmania. Although 47 years old, he was also an accomplished boxer, having been a champion in the Services competition while serving in the British Army, and was, according to author Syd Trigellis-Smith, renowned for his "...physical fitness, boundless energy and love of front-line service". Harcourt set upon the task of preparing the company, although initially he too was frustrated in his efforts by the problem with insufficient training supplies and equipment. Nevertheless, through the rest of June and into July, the training was intensified and all ranks received basic infantry training (as some were not yet infantry trained), and they became proficient in fieldcraft, signalling and demolitions and a number of field exercises were carried out to test their skills.

In July, the company moved north by train to Townsville in Queensland under tight security, bringing all their stores and equipment with them. During this time the company was camped at the Cluden Racecourse. Finally, the order for the company to deploy to New Guinea was received, and despite a refusal by dock workers to load their stores, by 10:30 hours on 2 August 1942, they had embarked on the MS Tasman after the company's engineer section took over the operation of the ship's loading equipment.

=== Papua New Guinea, 1942–1943 ===
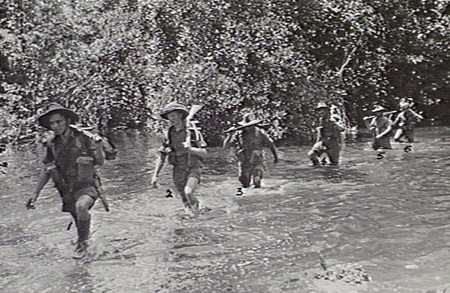
Members of the 2/6th patrol near Wanigela, New Guinea, October 1942

In early August 1942, the 2/6th arrived in Port Moresby to take part in the New Guinea campaign. Originally it was intended that they would be been flown from there to Wau, to reinforce the 2/5th Independent Company; however, due to the deteriorating situation in the Owen Stanley Ranges, they were sent to the Kokoda Track instead. Placed under the command of the 7th Division's headquarters, on 28 August 1942, the company moved up to Mount Eirama where they were employed as the divisional reserve. As the situation along the track continued to worsen for the Australians, the 2/6th moved to cover the Goldie River Valley in order to block any Japanese outflanking manoeuvres.

Long distance patrols were undertaken between 6 September and 12 October 1942 to cover wider lines of possible Japanese approach through the Yodda Valley, the jungle tracks around Esau Creek and the Brown River, and along Engineer Road in support of Honner Force. The purpose of these patrols was to obtain topographical information regarding the tracks in the area which might be used by Australian forces to outflank Japanese positions, as well as to provide early warning of any infiltration attempts. To this end, the patrols varied in size and duration, ranging from four or five men to 150 and from five to six days up to months. In some cases they acted as independent, long-range patrols, while others were in close contact with regular formations.

On 14 October 1942, elements (Note: A and D Patrols were still in the Kokoda area at this time, as well as Y Patrol which was heading to Yodda River. As such, just over 100 men arrived at Wanigela at this time. See Trigellis-Smith 1992, p. 82.) of the 2/6th were flown from 14-Mile Drome across the mountains to Wanigela Airfield, Wangiela. From Wanigela the company moved to Pongani. With the offensive started in the Battle of Buna–Gona, the 2/6th patrolled in front of the United States Army's 1st Battalion, 126th Infantry Regiment, along the coast from Pongani to Buna. Arriving at the front line at Buna on 20 November 1942, the 2/6th was engaged in the heavy fighting around the New Strip airfield until the early December 1942 during which time they were employed mainly in a traditional infantry role. In mid-December, the 2/6th was withdrawn to Soputa and then Port Moresby, where they spent Christmas prior to returning to Australia for re-organisation and refurbishment.

=== Re-organisation, 1943 ===
The 2/6th returned to Australia in March 1943 and after some leave, re-assembled at the Army's Jungle Warfare Centre at Canungra, Queensland. As part of a re-organisation that was being undertaken to refocus the Army on jungle warfare, the independent companies were amalgamated together to place them into a regimental structure. In line with this, the 2/6th, along with the 2/3rd and 2/5th Independent Companies, were brought together to form the 2/7th Cavalry (Commando) Regiment, which had been formed from the 7th Divisional Cavalry Regiment that had served in the Middle East and New Guinea in 1941 and 1942. This was an administrative re-organisation only, as the regiment itself had no operational role; however, following this the 2/6th Independent Company became known as the "2/6th Commando Squadron".

One of the main changes that occurred as a result of this re-organisation was that the engineer section was deleted from the establishment of the commando squadrons, having previously been an important part of the independent company structure. During this time, while the majority of the squadron was training in Australia, a small group of 2/6th men were sent to Bena Bena plateau in New Guinea in January 1943 to watch for enemy activity in the Ramu Valley and to secure Lutheran missionaries who were believed to have been providing information to the Japanese. This group operated in one or two man teams and were deployed for almost six months.

=== Markham–Ramu Campaign, 1943–1944 ===
The 2/6th sailed from Townsville for Port Moresby in August 1943, and then, in the middle of September it was flown to an area just west of the Leron River, in the Markham Valley for the upcoming Markham–Ramu campaign. Attached to the 7th Division, the squadron provided flank protection during the campaign, mainly carrying out reconnaissance and long range patrols, although they were also used to capture and hold ground in advance of the main formation at times.

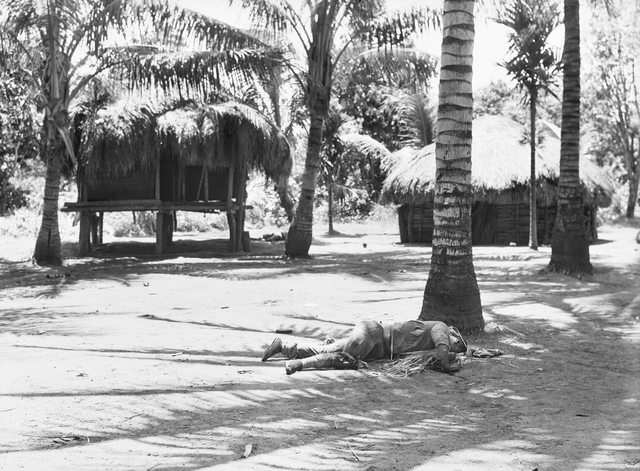
Japanese dead at Kaiapit; 214 were counted after the battle.

Now made up of a cadre of experienced and fully trained soldiers, the squadron performed with considerable distinction in this campaign, and was involved in arguably one of the most significant small unit actions of the campaign at the Battle of Kaiapit where, on 19–20 September 1943, it captured the village and then repelled a determined enemy counterattack by a force much larger than its own, until relieved. After the action, 214 Japanese bodies were counted, and it was estimated that another 50 or more lay dead in the tall grass. Abandoned equipment that was recovered included 19 machine guns, 150 rifles, six grenade throwers and 12 Japanese swords. Against this, the Australians lost 11 killed and 23 wounded. For his leadership during this action, Gordon King was later awarded the Distinguished Service Order.

After almost seven months of service in New Guinea, the 2/6th returned to Australia in April 1944, disembarking in Sydney on 12 May 1944. From then until late in the war there was a lull in Australian offensive operations in the Pacific and during this time, the company was based in the Mapee–Kairi area on the Atherton Tablelands, in Queensland, where it trained and conducted exercises with the rest of the 7th Division in preparation for renewed hostilities in 1945.

This was a period of considerable boredom for many members of the squadron, and there was a rise in disciplinary problems during this time as the only outlet for the men's physical energy was sport, training and mounting ceremonial duties. Finally, in May 1945, after almost a year sitting on the sidelines, the 2/6th received orders for overseas service. On 25 May, they travelled to Redlynch staging camp outside Cairns and embarked five days later on 30 May, on a 14-day voyage to Morotai Island, from where they embarked on Landing Ship Tanks (LSTs) for their final campaign of the war on late in June.

=== Borneo, 1945 ===
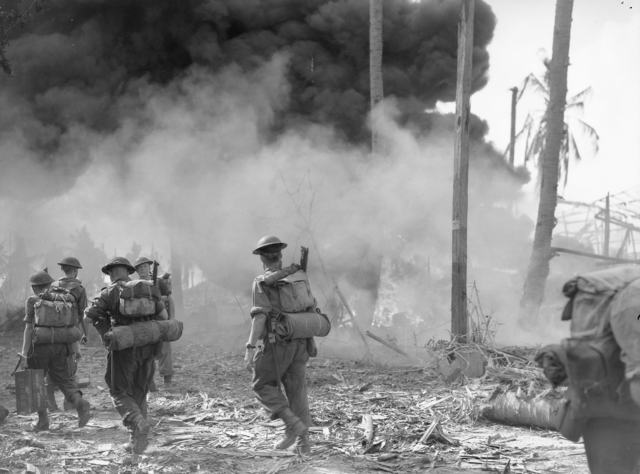
Members of the 7th Division at Balikpapan

One of the final Australian operations of the war occurred on the island of Borneo in mid-1945, just weeks before the Japanese capitulation. Although the necessity of the campaign has since been called into question, at the time it was felt that Borneo was strategically important due to its vast oil deposits, (Note: There were up to 700 oil wells in existence on Tarakan and before the war the island had produced up to six million barrels of crude oil per year. See Thompson 2008, pp. 477–478.) and numerous airfields and harbours which made it ideal as a springboard for operations in Malaya and Java which were planned for 1946 but which did not in the end eventuate.

With that goal, between May and July, the 7th and 9th Divisions made a series of landings on the island. These operations came to be known by the codename "Oboe". The first landing was made at Tarakan on 1 May by a single brigade, the 26th, from the 9th Division with the task of securing the airfield, while the rest of the division landed at Brunei Bay and Labuan Island later in June. The 7th Division landed at Balikpapan on 1 July 1945, having been given the tasks of securing the port, oil installations and airfields, and then destroying the Japanese forces there.

At Balikpapan, that the 2/6th Commando Squadron played its final part in the conflict. For the landing, it was attached to the 25th Brigade and went ashore on the second day of the battle. Over the course of the following three weeks the squadron supported the 25th Brigade in its advance along the Milford Highway. Among its other tasks, which included its normal role of conducting reconnaissance patrols, it also conducted a number of aggressive fighting patrols and successful ambushes along Pope's Track and provided humanitarian assistance to the local inhabitants.

=== Disbandment, 1946 ===
Following the end of hostilities in the Pacific against the Japanese, there was to be no triumphant return to Australia for the 2/6th as a formed unit. Once the fighting on Borneo had stopped, the company was moved to a camp at Manggar Beach. Here they carried out various garrison duties and settled down to await further orders. On 6 October 1945 the unit was declared surplus to the Army's requirements and slowly its numbers began to dwindle as members marched out. Some 2/6th men were destined for service with the British Commonwealth Occupation Force in Japan or garrison duties elsewhere as there were still many Japanese troops at large, while others, who had earned enough points (Note: During the Second World War the Australian Army, like many others at the time, used a points system to determine a serviceman's eligibility for discharge or repatriation. These points were allocated based upon factors such as time served in a combat zone, overseas service, wounds received and any honours or awards that the serviceman might have received, as well as age and marital status. See Grey 2008, p. 198.) to do so were to be demobilised and returned to Australia.

General (later Field Marshal Sir) Thomas Blamey, the Commander-in-Chief of Australian Military Forces, inspected the 25th Brigade on 17 October, and then two days later they paraded before the Commander-in-Chief of South East Asia Command (SEAC), Admiral Lord Louis Mountbatten who praised them for their turn out and thanked them for their service. On 20 November, the "low priority" men (those who had served the least amount of time) marched out of the 2/6th to join the 2/27th Battalion, while the higher priority men (those who were eligible for discharge before the others) were sent to the 2/12th Battalion two days later. This left the squadron with just two officers and 19 men. Together they returned to Australia, arriving in Brisbane on 31 December 1945, and marching to Chermside camp where they conducted the final formalities of disbandment. The unit's last day of service on the Australian order of battle was 15 January 1946, when the final three members, including the acting CO, Captain Gordon Blainey, were dispersed and returned to their states of enlistment for demobilisation.

Throughout the course of the war, the 2/6th lost 58 men killed in action or died of wounds, while a further 80 were wounded in action. Members of the squadron received the following decorations: one Distinguished Service Order, (Note: Captain G.G King, action at Kaiapit, New Guinea, 20 September 1943. See Trigellis-Smith 1992, p. 276.) two Military Crosses, (Note: Lieutenant R.T Balderstone, action at Kaiapit, New Guinea, 20 September 1943 and Lieutenant C.H Ball, action at Balikpapan, Borneo, 15 July 1945. See Trigellis-Smith 1992, pp. 276–277.) one Distinguished Conduct Medal, (Note: Acting Sergeant J.McA Brammer, action at Uria River, Dumpu area, New Guinea, 8 October 1943. See Trigellis-Smith 1992, p. 278.) two Military Medals, (Note: Corporal J.A Wilson, action at Kaiapit, New Guinea, 19–20 September 1943 and Private S.J Graham, action at Kaiapit, New Guinea, 19–20 September 1943. See Trigellis-Smith 1992, pp. 278–279.) 23 Mentions in Despatches and one US Silver Star. (Note: Major H.G Harcourt, action near Buna, New Guinea, period of 16 November – 2 December 1942. See Trigellis-Smith 1992, p. 277.) No battle honours were awarded to the squadron, as these were awarded to its parent formation, the 2/7th Cavalry Commando Regiment.

== Commanding officers ==
The following is a list of the 2/6th's commanding officers during the war:

- Major Harry Harcourt, DSO & Bar, MC (June 1942 – August 1943) (Note: Harcourt was later appointed an Officer of the Order of the British Empire in 1955 for services to the Australian community as a civilian. He also later received the US Silver Star for his actions during the Buna campaign when the squadron worked closely with the Americans. Among the British awards that he received during his time in the British Army, he received a number of foreign awards including the Order of St Valdimir, the Order of St Stanislaus, the French Croix de Guerre and Legion d'Honneur and was Mentioned in Despatches three times. He had achieved his majority by age 23 and had served in the Royal Dublin Fusiliers and been attached to the Machine Gun Corps. See Trigellis-Smith 1992, pp. 2–3.)
- Major Gordon Grimsley King, DSO (August 1943 – July 1945) (Note: Later Lieutenant-Colonel G.G King. King was awarded his DSO for his leadership during the action at Kaiapit on 20 September 1943, see Trigellis-Smith 1992, p. 276.)
- Captain G.C Blainey (July 1945 – January 1946)

== Notes ==
Footnotes

Citations
