= Z Experimental Station =

Australian intelligence service facility

Coordinates: 16.9358°S 145.7386°E

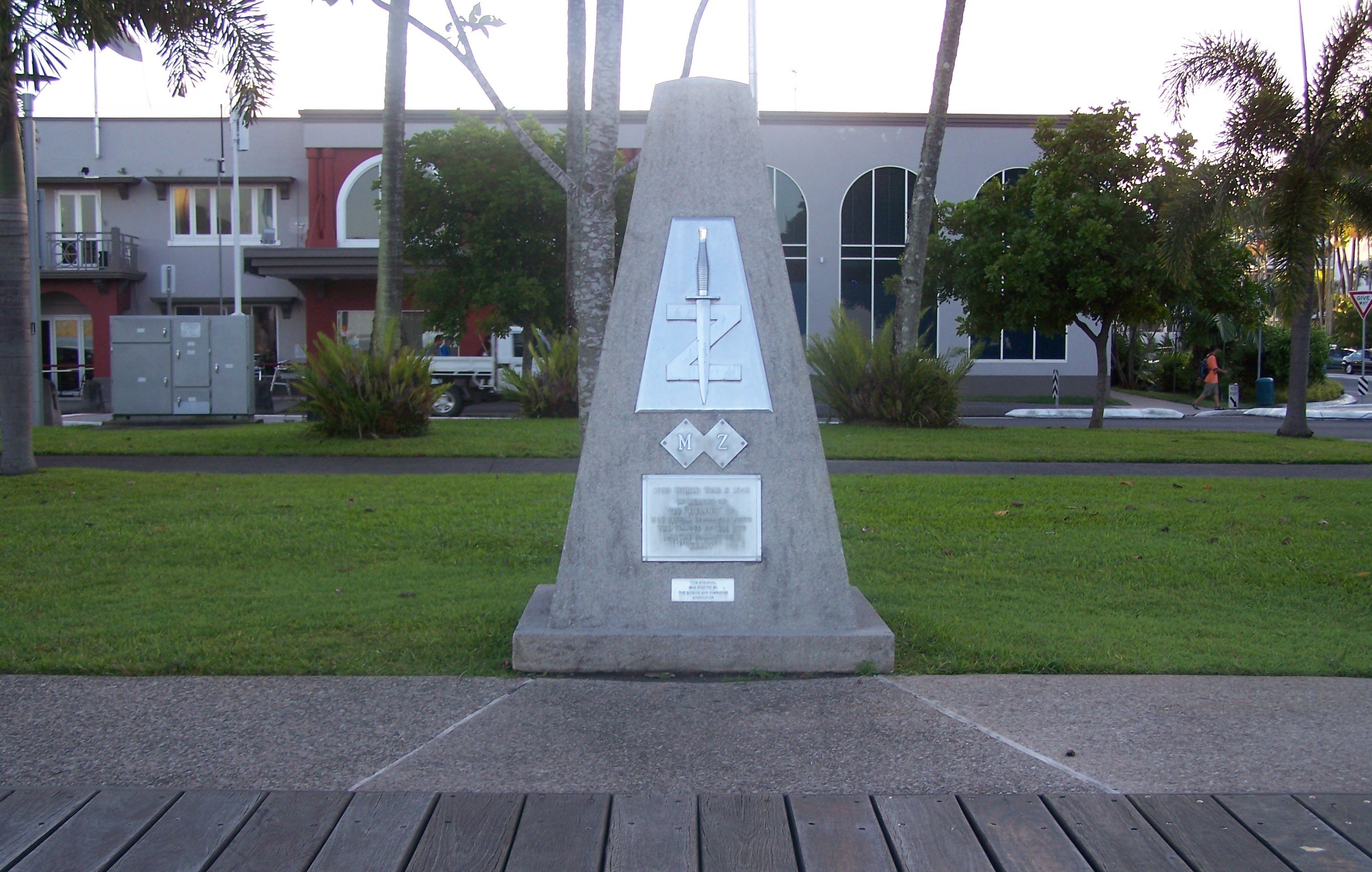
The M/Z Special Units' Monument on "The Esplanade", Cairns on 26 March 2007.

The MV Krait, the vessel which carried the men of Z Special Unit on Operation Jaywick, the successful raid on Singapore Harbour on the night of 1943-09-26.

The Z Experimental Station (ZES) was established in July 1942 at Munro Terrace, Mooroobool, Cairns, Queensland, Australia, jointly by Secret Intelligence Australia and the Inter-Allied Services Department. The building chosen to be the headquarters was known as "Fairview" (or House on the Hill), and it had been the home of Richard Ash Kingsford, the first mayor of Cairns and grandfather of aviator Sir Charles Kingsford Smith.

As far as ISD was concerned it was used as a wireless relay station for the New Guinea Section. The site was selected by Commander Roy Kendall, the head of SIA and was about 3 miles (4.8 km) inland from the town of Cairns, North Queensland. The site was originally chosen for its good radio reception. There were, however, good security conditions for training, until the Cairns district became a very active assembly area for Australian and US troops operating in New Guinea.

Until June 42, ISD special operations personnel were trained at the Guerilla Warfare School, Foster, but this establishment in the south of Victoria had an extremely rugged climate, which continuously resulted in sickness on the part of operatives who had lived for many years in the tropics. Since ZES was the only ISD establishment outside the headquarters in Melbourne, it became a holding establishment as well as a training school. It was set up at a time when the town of Cairns was partly evacuated, and the area was isolated from the rest of Australia.

Owing to transport difficulties, many of the New Guinea operatives were delayed in Cairns after their training was completed for as much as 69 days. This worked both against security and against the morale of the operatives.

When the transport arrangements had been finalised, several operations staged out of the Z Experimental Station, including the famous Operation Jaywick raid into Singapore Harbour. This was due to Cairns' proximity to the islands in the South West Pacific Area. The Jaywick party departed Cairns near midnight 9 August 1943 in the MV Krait and sailed along the northern coast before reaching Potshot in North Western Australia which was the departure point for the Jaywick mission.

Basic special operations training was undertaken at the ZES. This instruction included weapons training, minor tactics, demolitions, folboat operations, signals, codes and ciphers, first aid and unarmed combat.

It was out of the ZES base that the first testing and evaluation of Hoehn military folboats were conducted in the surrounding rivers and out of the port of Cairns. This type of craft were successfully used in many Commando operations in the Pacific during World War II, including Operation Jaywick, Operation Rimau and Operation Copper.

With the continuing influx of Allied service personnel into Cairns and with many local Cairns families returning to their homes after evacuating, the security situation for the ZES deteriorated to the extent that a new training facility had to be found. A site on Fraser Island in South East Queensland was selected and all basic Special Operations training had been transferred to the Fraser Commando School by October 1943. In the meantime, ZES continued to be used for specialist training for Allied Intelligence Bureau (AIB) personnel in such subjects as jungle foods and advanced demolitions.

With the liquidation of the ISD in April 1943, the ZES was handed over to the AIB for use by the Netherlands East Indies Forces Intelligence Service, Section III (NEFIS III). Operating as a field intelligence unit, NEFIS III continued to train Indonesian operatives at ZES and use it as a staging point for operations.

ZES was closed down in December, 1945 and the property disposed of by the Australian Government in 1950. The building was subsequently destroyed in a fire and in 1996 a 72-apartment complex with six three-storey buildings was constructed on the site.

== See also ==
- Z Special Unit
