= Harry Harcourt =

British and Australian Army officer

Harry Gladwyn Harcourt
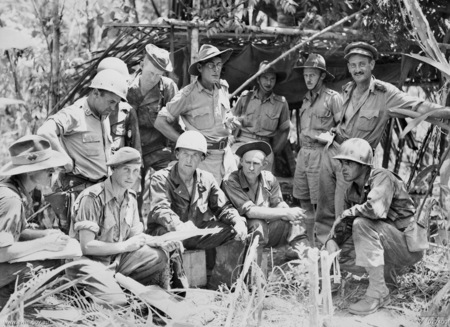
- Australian and US officers conduct an orders group at Wanigela, New Guinea in October 1942. Harcourt is the officer wearing the beret
- Born: 13 February 1895; Westcliff-on-Sea, Essex, England
- Died: 20 December 1970 (aged 75); Hobart, Tasmania, Australia
- Military career
- Allegiance: United Kingdom; Australia
- Branch: British Army; Australian Army
- Service years: 1914–1927; 1940–1946
- Rank: Major
- Commands: 2/6th Independent Company
- Conflicts: First World War; Gallipoli campaign; Western Front; Russian Civil War; North Russia Campaign; Second World War; New Guinea campaign; Borneo campaign
- Awards: Distinguished Service Order & Bar; Officer of the Order of the British Empire; Military Cross; Mentioned in Despatches (3); Silver Star (United States); Order of St. Vladimir (Russia); Order of Saint Stanislaus (Russia); Légion d'honneur (France); Croix de Guerre (France)

Harry Gladwyn Harcourt, DSO & Bar, OBE, MC (Note: Only Commonwealth awards are shown as postnominals, thus Harcourt's French, Russian and US decorations are not listed. Additionally, an MID does not confer postnominals, hence it is not included here.) (13 February 1895 – 20 December 1970) was an officer in the British Army and later the Australian Army who commanded an Australian commando unit during the Second World War.

Harcourt's military career began in 1914 when he was commissioned into the British Army. During the First World War he served on the Western Front, commanding a machine gun unit. He gained promotion quickly, advancing to the rank of major by the end of the war. He also received a number of notable decorations. Later, Harcourt served during the Russian Civil War before emigrating to Australia in 1929. Following this, he worked as a public servant in Tasmania before the outbreak of the Second World War when he joined the Australian Army and subsequently went on to serve in the Australian commandos, taking part in the fighting in New Guinea and Borneo.

Following the end of the war, Harcourt retired from the military and returned to working for the Tasmanian government. He died in 1970 at the age of 75.

== First World War ==
Harcourt was born in Westcliff-on-Sea, in Essex, England, on 13 February 1895. In 1914, he entered the British Army as a second lieutenant with a Regular commission. Initially, he served with the 1st Battalion, Royal Dublin Fusiliers, taking part in the disastrous Gallipoli campaign before he was seconded to the Machine Gun Corps with whom he served on the Western Front in France and Belgium. With this service Harcourt was quickly promoted, first to acting captain, then acting major by the time he was 23 years old. Despite holding these acting ranks, he was not substantively promoted to lieutenant until mid-1918, although when it was announced his seniority was backdated to November 1917. At one point he held three different ranks, a substantive rank of second lieutenant, a temporary rank of lieutenant and an acting rank of major. For his service during the war, Harcourt received a Distinguished Service Order, a Military Cross, and was mentioned in despatches three times. He also received the French Croix de Guerre and the Légion d'honneur.

== Russian Civil War ==
In early 1919, Harcourt was attending a staff course in the United Kingdom when he heard about the deteriorating situation in North Russia. Hoping to secure a position on the Relief Force that was being sent, Harcourt went to the War Office where he offered his services. Due to his experience with the Machine Gun Corps, he was offered command of a machine gun unit with the acting rank of major. However, the unit had not been formed and Harcourt was told that it was up to him to carry out his own recruiting. Having met a number of Australian soldiers during the previous war, Harcourt decided to go to the First Australian Imperial Force (AIF) headquarters at Horseferry Road, where he spoke to a number of officers and other ranks who were still waiting for repatriation to Australia. Finding that there was considerable enthusiasm, particularly amongst the other ranks, Harcourt eventually arranged for the recruitment of between 400 and 500 Australians into the British Army for service in Russia although in the end only about 150–300 Australians completed the process.

These men formed part of the North Russia Relief Force (NRRF), which departed for Archangel in the SS Czar and Czarina. Soon after landing in Archangel in June 1919 the NRRF began an offensive campaign designed to push the Bolshevik forces back so that the White Russian forces could carry out a withdrawal to Archangel. This offensive was initially focused upon the railways and river systems and Harcourt was ordered to move his unit along the Archangel–Vologda railway line and to engage any Bolshevik forces encountered. By July they had reached Obozerskaya, about 100 miles (160 km) south of Archangel and about 15 miles (24 km) north from Emtsa, where they established a base from which further operations against the Bolshevik forward areas.

At this time Harcourt was placed in command of a composite company made up of machine gunners, artillerymen and infantry, which became known as "Harcourt Force". The unit carried out patrols and probing raids in their area of operations and Harcourt was tasked with planning an attack on Bolshevik positions around Emtsa. As the situation continued to deteriorate for the Allies plans were made for the force to begin withdrawing. On 29 August 1919, the last British offensive was launched at Emtsa. Harcourt's force was tasked with capturing an artillery battery in the main Bolshevik position, however, his guide led him to the wrong objective in the darkness and suddenly the company came under intense and unexpectedly heavy fire. Although wounded, Harcourt liaised with a company from the 45th Battalion, Royal Fusiliers, and together they captured the main battery. For this action Harcourt received a Bar to his DSO. The citation reads:

For great gallantry and good leadership in command of a company on 29 August 1919. His guide led him to the wrong objective, and the company unexpectedly came under heavy fire. He showed great coolness and ability, and finally, with the assistance of another company, took the main battery position. He was wounded early in the action.

The engagement ended with the surrender of the Bolshevik forces, however, as Harcourt prepared his men for an advance south to Vologda he received orders to pull back to Archangel and eventually they were evacuated back to England where the men were demobilised and Harcourt returned to the Royal Dublin Fusiliers. For his services, however, the Russian government-in-exile presented him with both the Order of Saint Vladimir and the Order of Saint Stanislaus, 2nd Class, with Swords.

== Inter-war years ==
During the 1920s Harcourt continued to serve with the British Army and was stationed in India. It was while he was on the subcontinent that he discovered an alternative route between India and Burma. The significance of this find was not immediately realised until 1942 when, after the Japanese invaded Burma and subsequently gained control of the only known route out of Burma, British intelligence recalled Harcourt's discovery and using this information the Allies were able to route their withdrawing armies and the large numbers of refugees around the main Japanese force back into India. This route became known as "Harcourt's Highway".

In 1927, Harcourt took a leave of absence from the British Army and in 1929 he travelled to Australia. He eventually applied for a discharge from the army and decided to settle in Victoria. Later he moved to Tasmania where he took a job with the government and became a civil servant. He also became involved in the Boy Scouts and in 1933 he served as secretary and organiser of the first World Scout Jamboree to be held in Australia, taking place over Christmas 1933–34. On 28 April 1939, while he was working with the Youth Employment Office in Hobart, Harcourt was involved in a motor vehicle accident at Kings Meadows, Launceston. While attempting to take evasive action to avoid hitting a car that was driving on the wrong side of the road, Harcourt's car collided with a pedestrian who had been walking on the road. Although Harcourt rushed the pedestrian, an eight-year-old boy, to hospital, the boy's injuries proved fatal. An inquest was subsequently held and found that Harcourt was in no way to blame for the accident.

== Second World War ==
When the Second World War broke out in September 1939 Harcourt sought to return to the United Kingdom to rejoin the British Army. As his job was considered vital to the war effort, the Australian government prevented him from leaving, however, he was eventually allowed to join the Militia. On 3 August 1940, he reported for war service and was appointed as a lieutenant. A short time later he was officially promoted to major and taken on the strength of the headquarters of the 6th Military District (Tasmania) as the brigade major of the 12th Infantry Brigade based at Brighton. In February 1941 Harcourt was allowed to transfer to the Second Australian Imperial Force (2nd AIF)—thus allowing him to serve overseas (Note: At the time the provisions of the Defence Act (1903) prevented the government deploying members of the Militia outside Australia and its territories - PNG was an Australian territory at the time but the Japanese had not entered WW2 at the time so the 2ndAIF was "aimed" at the Middle East. As a consequence of this, at the time Australia had two armies, the first one being the Militia for defence of Australia and its territories and the 2ndAIF for world wide deployment. In 1943 the provisions of the Act were amended by the Defence (Citizen Military Forces) Act 1943 to allow the deployment of the Militia to combat zones in the South West Pacific Area. The provision automatically lapsed six months after the cessation of hostilities.)—and after undergoing training at Puckapunyal he was subsequently posted to the 2/9th Armoured Regiment in August 1941, as the officer commanding 'C' Squadron.

In mid-1942, Harcourt was seconded for special duties and was temporarily posted to the Guerrilla Warfare School that had been set up at Wilsons Promontory in Victoria to begin training independent companies in irregular warfare techniques based on the recommendations of the British Military Mission in Australia, headed by Lieutenant Colonel J.C. Mawhood. In order to prove himself fit for active service with the independent companies Harcourt was required to pass a rigorous physical fitness and endurance program that was said to have tested even the instructors at the school, many of whom were a lot younger than Harcourt, who was 47 at the time. On 6 June 1942, Harcourt became the commanding officer of the 2/6th Independent Company, which would later be renamed the 2/6th Commando Squadron.

Almost immediately Harcourt began the process of preparing the company for operational service in the Pacific. A shortage of stores and equipment initially hampered the company's training, however, in mid July they entrained and were moved north to Queensland where they were initially based at Yandina before moving to Townsville on 28 July 1942. On 2 August 1942, the company embarked on the MS Tasman bound for New Guinea.

On 6 August 1942, the 2/6th Independent Company disembarked in Port Moresby and shortly afterwards it was placed directly under the command of the headquarters of the 7th Division. As the Japanese began to advance over the Owen Stanley Range towards Port Moresby the company began patrolling operations to the west of Port Moresby and Harcourt was given responsibility for advising divisional headquarters of Japanese movements around the Kokoda Track and to provide protection for the division's flanks.

Later, in November and December 1942 the company fought alongside the 126th and 128th Infantry Regiments around Buna, where they were used mainly in the reconnaissance role, but also as assault troops where necessary. During this time, Harcourt reported directly to the 32nd Division's commander, Major General Edwin Harding on the location of Japanese forces, as well as the progress and disposition of US forces in the region. At the end of the fighting around Buna Harcourt was decorated with the Silver Star for gallantry by General MacArthur, who later singled the 2/6th Independent Company out for special praise in his Order of the Day on 9 January 1943. The award was later reported in Hobart's The Mercury newspaper on 21 January 1943.

In writing the official history of the Australian involvement in the early campaigns in the Pacific, Dudley McCarthy described Harcourt as being "an intrepid officer whose forty-seven years seemingly had done nothing to lessen his zest for living, his energy or his physical endurance". Nevertheless, in July 1943, following service in New Guinea Harcourt was told that he was too old for active service and was subsequently detached to the headquarters of II Corps on 18 July 1943 before officially relinquishing command of the 2/6th on 8 August 1943. He was later transferred to the Jungle Warfare Training Centre at Canungra, in Queensland, where he served as a senior instructor and then later commanding officer of the 3rd Australian Reinforcement Training Battalion (Jungle Warfare).

In late 1944, Harcourt was able to secure a posting to the 2/7th Cavalry Commando Regiment, one of three Australian commando regiments that were set up to administer the independent companies, and he became the regimental second-in-command. In May 1945, Harcourt took part in the landing at Balikpapan, after the regiment was committed to the fighting on Borneo late in the war. Following the end of hostilities in September 1945 Harcourt was repatriated to Tasmania and on 20 November 1945 his appointment in the 2nd AIF was terminated.

== Later life ==
Upon leaving the Army in 1946, Harcourt returned to the public service, being appointed the deputy director of Industrial Training in Tasmania under the Commonwealth Reconstruction Training Scheme. He remained in this role until 1949 when he undertook a research position with the Industrial Development Branch of the Premier's Department (Tasmania). During this time, Harcourt was also actively involved in Legacy, helping to establish facilities at Coningham, teaching night classes in carpentry and metal work.

Between 1952 and 1967 Harcourt served as State Secretary of the Tasmanian branch of the Australian Legion of Ex-Servicemen and Women. In 1954 he was the official transport officer for the Royal visit to Australia. In 1955, he was appointed an Officer of the Order of the British Empire in the Queen's Birthday Honours List for his community work and involvement in the public service. (Note: The award has been listed on the Australian Honours Database as "Henry Gladwin Harcourt". Additionally while the database lists the date of conferment as being 1955, Trigellis-Smith states that it was 1957.) During 1957–58, Harcourt served as the President of Legacy's Hobart Branch.

Harcourt died at the Hobart Repatriation Hospital on 20 December 1970, at the age of 75. (Note: Bottrell states that Harcourt was 76 at the time of his death.) He was survived by his wife and step son. In 1971, Arthur Bottrell, author of Cameo of Commandos, dedicated the introduction of his book to Harcourt.

== Notes ==
Footnotes

Citations
