= Secret Intelligence Australia =

Secret Service

Secret Intelligence Australia (SIA) was a British World War II intelligence unit commanded by Captain Roy Kendall who reported directly to MI6 in London. SIA was known as Section B of the Allied Intelligence Bureau but was not accountable in any way to the Australians or the Americans.

SIA had two main functions:

1. Gather information on the enemy and his activities through special means and channels concerning which detailed secret instructions would be issued from time to time.
2. Specifically charged with obtaining information from the Netherlands East Indies (NEI) through Islamic channels.

SIA was a very specialised unit designed primarily to deal with subversion. As organised, it was better adapted to the needs of industrialised, congested national or metropolitan areas than to conditions in the Pacific. In order to preserve the security of its parent organisation in Britain (SIS or MI6), Allied General Headquarters (GHQ) in the SWPA agreed that SIA could live a very self-contained existence. Records were kept to the minimum.

SIA's initial operations were concerned with the introduction of native religious leaders, whose immediate object was to gain intelligence, and whose incidental object was to maintain Islamic solidarity to offset Japanese racial propaganda. For this purpose, Hajjis were imported from Mecca. The decision to use Hajjis followed upon the advice of the Rajah of Sarawak, then in Australia.

The casualty rate was high among Dutch and Australian operatives attempting to penetrate NEI and the islands to the north of Australia. GHQ believed that the use of itinerant Imams (priests), whom the natives were not likely to betray, had good possibilities. Great difficulty was experienced in inserting these specialised agents, however, and still more in following up to obtain the results of their activities. Several of them apparently were captured, as nothing was heard of them again. However, later in the war, others managed to obtain useful information before Allied forces occupied the islands in the Halmahera island group, particularly Morotai.

The SIA Section assisted in the development of a Celebes coastwatcher net under a general AIB plan known as "Co-monitor". SIA parties operated in the Banda Sea area, flashing their signals to the net control stations at Biak and Darwin. SIA's communication net was operated in conjunction with the existing Netherlands net.

In 1945, not long before the surrender, SIA succeeded in establishing five excellent information and weather-reporting secret stations in the hostile Java area. One operated off Soerabaja, in the west, while another covered the Sunda Straits, between Java and Sumatra; three others were on islands on the perimeter of Java. These stations were in operation at the war's end, and in fact, were continued for a while after the cessation of hostilities in order to check movements of Japanese renegade forces.

== Locations ==
SIA operatives trained at Caboolture, Queensland and at the Z Experimental Station in Cairns, Far North Queensland.

The headquarters of SIA was at "Craigroyston" in Bowen Terrace, in the suburb of New Farm in Brisbane.

== Known operations (Java Sea) ==
- CAEN
- BATH
- LONDON
- CREW
- DOVER
- LEEDS
