= 2/27th Battalion (Australia) =

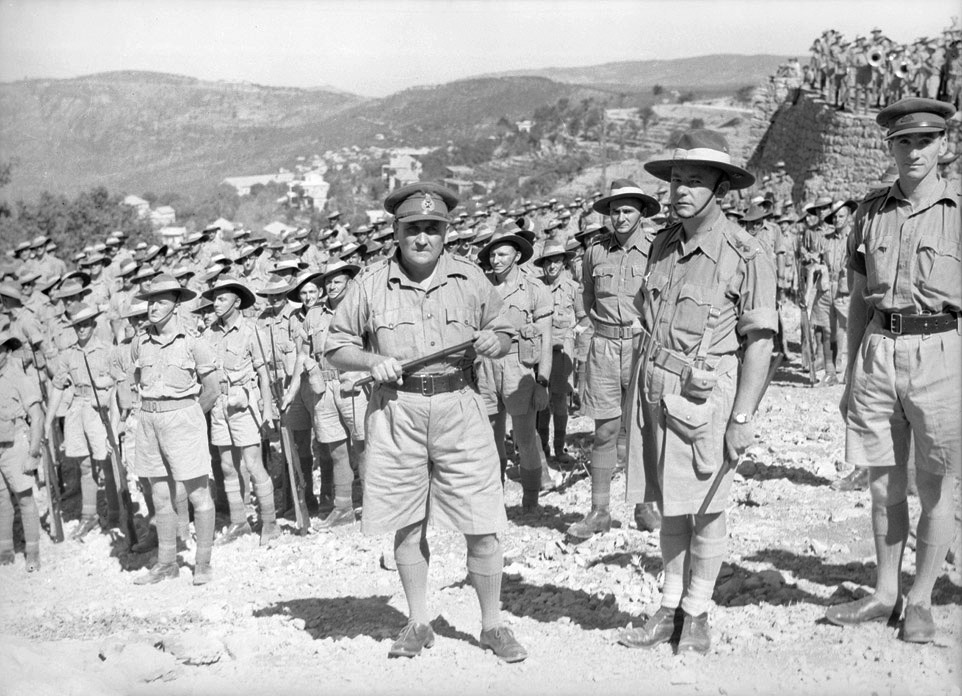
- Troops from the 2/27th at Hammana, Lebanon on 2 September 1941, including their commander, Lieutenant Colonel Murray Moten and Major General Arthur Allen
- Active: 1940–1946
- Country: Australia
- Branch: Army
- Type: Infantry
- Size: ~800–900 men (Note: At the start of World War II, the authorised strength of an Australian infantry battalion was 910 men all ranks; later, after the AIF divisions were restructured for jungle warfare, it fell to 803.)
- Part of: 21st Brigade, 7th Division
- Engagements: World War II: North Africa Campaign; Syria–Lebanon Campaign; New Guinea Campaign; Borneo Campaign

Insignia
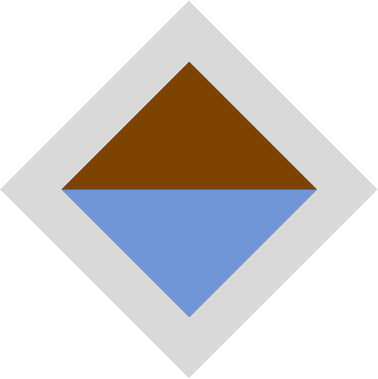
- Unit colour patch

The 2/27th Battalion was an infantry battalion of the Australian Army during World War II. Raised in May 1940 as part of the 7th Division from volunteers from the state of South Australia, the battalion was assigned to the 21st Brigade. After completing training in Australia, the 2/27th deployed to the Middle East in November 1940, and in early 1941 undertook defensive duties in the Western Desert. The battalion's first combat experience came against the Vichy French during the short Syria–Lebanon campaign during which it fought major engagements around Sidon and Damour. At the conclusion of the fighting in Syria, the battalion remained in the area as part of the Allied occupation force until early 1942 when it was returned to Australia to fight against the Japanese.

From September 1942 until early 1943, the 2/27th took part in the Kokoda Track campaign and then the Battle of Buna–Gona, before being withdrawn to Australia where it was rebuilt. In August 1943, the 2/27th returned to New Guinea and subsequently took part in the Finisterre Range campaign, leading the 21st Brigade's effort to capture Shaggy Ridge, remaining there until early 1944. The battalion's final campaign of the war came in the final months of the conflict during the Borneo campaign when it took part in the landing at Balikpapan. Following a short stint on occupation duties in the Celebes Islands after the end of the war, the battalion was disbanded in Australia in early 1946.

== History ==
=== Formation ===
The 2/27th Battalion (Note: The numerical designation of 2nd AIF units was prefixed by "2/", which was used to set them apart from Militia units with corresponding numerical designations.) was raised as part of the all-volunteer Second Australian Imperial Force (2nd AIF) at Woodside Barracks, South Australia, on 7 May 1940. Along with the 2/14th and 2/16th Battalions, it was attached to the 21st Brigade, which formed part of the 7th Division, the second infantry division raised as part of the 2nd AIF. With an authorised strength of 910 men of all ranks, it was organised into four rifle companies designated 'A' to 'D' with a battalion headquarters, regimental aid post, and a headquarters company consisting of specialist signals, anti-aircraft, mortar, carrier, pioneer and administrative platoons. The battalion's first commanding officer was Lieutenant Colonel Murray Moten, a former Militia officer who had previously commanded the South Australian-based 48th Battalion.

The colours chosen for the battalion's unit colour patch (UCP) were the same as those of the 27th Battalion, a unit which had served during World War I before being raised as a Militia formation in 1921. These colours were brown over light blue, in a diamond shape, although a border of gray in an oval shape was added to the UCP to distinguish the battalion from its Militia counterpart. After undertaking rudimentary training, in October 1940 the battalion was moved by train to Melbourne, where it embarked for overseas aboard the transport Mauretania. Sailing via India, the 2/27th briefly made camp at Deolali, outside of Bombay for a week before embarking on the Takliwa for the rest of the journey to the Middle East. The battalion arrived in Egypt on 24 November, making landfall at Kantara moving to Julius Camp in Palestine for further training.

=== Syria and Lebanon ===
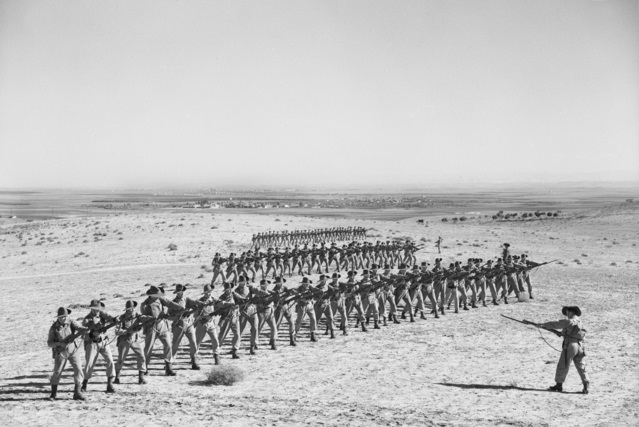
2/27th Battalion at bayonet practice in Palestine, December 1940

After completing its training in Palestine, the 2/27th Battalion was moved to Egypt–Libya border in April 1941. There, along with the rest of the 21st Brigade, they undertook defensive duties, occupying defensive positions around Mersa Matruh and Maaten Bagush in anticipation of the German and Italian advance. The battalion remained there until late May, and although they were not directly involved in ground combat, they experienced their first attacks by German aircraft. They were subsequently returned to Palestine ahead of the battalion's first combat assignment, the invasion of Syria and Lebanon, which began in early June. During the subsequent fighting against Vichy forces, the 2/27th took part in the drive up the Lebanon coast, taking part in several engagements including fighting around Adloun on 11 June and Miye-ou-miye on 13–14 June as part of the capture of Sidon, which fell on 15 June. The following month, the battalion also took part in the Battle of Damour. After five weeks of fighting an armistice was signed on 12 July. Following the surrender of Vichy forces, the unit undertook garrison duties around Hammana, near Beirut, and Bakhaoun in the Tripoli sector, as part of the Allied occupation force, remaining there until January 1942. At the end of the campaign, Moten was decorated and promoted; he was replaced as commander of the 2/27th by Lieutenant Colonel Geoffrey Cooper.

Following Japan's entry into the war in December 1941, the Australian government began pressing for some of the AIF forces in the Middle East to be returned to Australia, to help defend against the Japanese advance in the Pacific. In late January 1942, the 2/27th embarked from Egypt aboard the Ile de France, sailing once again via Bombay. There, the battalion was transferred to the City of London. During the voyage, there were plans to divert the convoy to Java, to reinforce the Australian and Dutch forces there against the Japanese, but the deteriorating situation there resulted in the convoy being re-routed. After a port-call in Colombo, the convoy reached Fremantle on 15 March for a brief shore leave before proceeding on to Port Adelaide, where the 2/27th disembarked. Following a brief period of leave, the 21st Brigade concentrated in Queensland – the 2/27th being based around Caloundra – where, over the course of several months, they were prepared for deployment to the Pacific theatre.

=== New Guinea ===
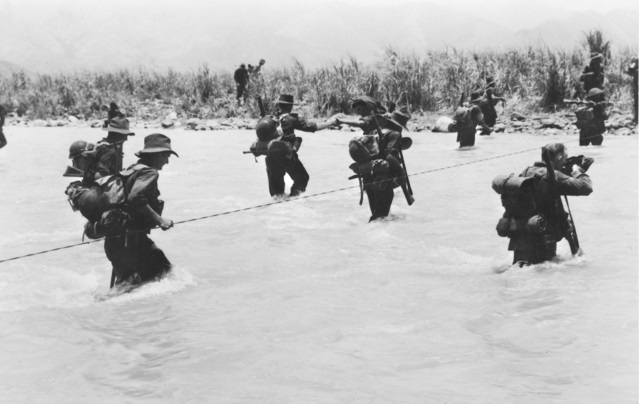
A Company, 2/27th Battalion cross the Surinam River in the Ramu Valley, New Guinea, October 1943

In mid-August 1942, the 2/27th battalion was deployed to New Guinea, where the Japanese were threatening to capture Port Moresby, following a landing around Buna in July. After initially being kept back at Port Moresby in reserve as the Battle of Milne Bay was fought, in early September 1942, at the height of the Kokoda Track campaign, the 2/27th moved north towards the Kokoda Track, joining Brigadier Arnold Potts' Maroubra Force. Following delaying actions around Isurava, the Australians had been forced to withdraw further south along the track, and in an effort to stem the Japanese advance, on 6 September the 2/27th, as the freshest of the 21st Brigade's units, was committed to the fighting, taking up a defensive position at Mission Ridge, on the northern face of Brigade Hill. For the next two days, the battalion held off a frontal attack by a Japanese battalion, but as a result of flanking moves a withdrawal to Menari was ordered and the 2/14th and 2/16th Battalions withdrew, leaving their wounded with the 2/27th, who formed the brigade rearguard. After 'B' and 'C' Companies launched a brief, but successful local counterattack, the 2/27th was also able to break contact. With the Japanese pressing hard, Potts ordered a further withdrawal from Menari before the 2/27th arrived, effectively cutting it off from the rest of the brigade. For the next two weeks, the 2/27th fought through the jungle, carrying their wounded with them, to regain contact with supporting units, eventually linking up with them at Jawarere on 22 September.

After this, the battalion, having suffered heavily from disease, was briefly withdrawn back to Port Moresby for rest at the end of the month. In October, the 2/27th provided one company to the ad hoc Chaforce, providing work parties to bring up supplies and evacuate the wounded as the Australians advanced towards the Kumusi River, after the Japanese were pushed back from Kokoda. Also in October, the battalion provided a company to Jawforce, carrying out patrols between Jawarere and Nigabaifa, while a platoon was dispatched to Eilogo to form Eilogo Force. Both of these elements returned to the main body of the 2/27th in mid-November, although Chaforce remained detached at that time. In late November, the 2/27th was recommitted to the fighting as the Japanese withdrew towards their beachheads in the north. Even though it remained at only half strength, the battalion was moved by air from Port Moresby to Popondetta, and from there they joined the fighting around Gona, where the company that had been attached to Chaforce was also fighting. The fighting that followed severely depleted the battalion due to heavy casualties and tropical diseases and, as a result, by mid-January 1943 its fighting strength had fallen to just 70 men, and it was subsequently relieved by the 36th Battalion around the mouth of the Amboga River. It was then withdrawn back to Popondetta and then Dobodura for air transport back to Port Moresby. In Port Moresby, after a week of rest, the 2/27th embarked upon the transport Jason Lee for the voyage back to Australia, landing at Cairns in late January, before returning to the Atherton Tablelands.

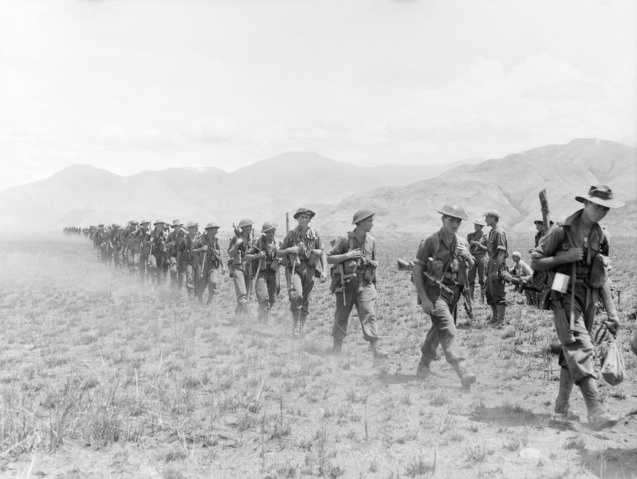
Men of the 2/27th Battalion cross a valley in the Finisterre Ranges, New Guinea, 5 October 1943

In March 1943, Lieutenant Colonel John Bishop, a former staff officer, took over as commanding officer, replacing Cooper who had been wounded at Gona in late 1942. The battalion was rebuilt on the Atherton Tablelands as part of preparations to make it ready for further operations in New Guinea. A period of rest and reorganisation followed, during which a batch of over 100 reinforcements was received from the 16th Motor Regiment. As part of the battalion's reorganisation under the Jungle divisional establishment, its authorised strength fell to 803 men many of its vehicles and heavy equipment were returned as the Australian Army was restructured to focus upon operations in the Pacific.

In August 1943, the 2/27th returned to New Guinea and subsequently took part in the Ramu Valley–Finisterre Range campaign, flying into Kaiapit before beginning its advance towards Dumpu in September, which was undertaken following the capture of Lae and the Huon Peninsula campaign as part of efforts to advance towards Madang. Advancing through the Ramu Valley towards the range, the 2/27th saw heavy fighting as the 21st Brigade led the 7th Division's efforts to capture the high ground around Shaggy Ridge. In mid-October, the 2/27th helped turn back a heavy Japanese counterattack around John's Knoll and Trevor's Ridge, before the 21st Brigade was relieved. Halfway through the campaign, in mid-November, Bishop was replaced as battalion commander by Lieutenant Colonel Keith Picken, and returned to a staff position. Picken subsequently led the battalion throughout the remainder of the war. By early January 1944, the 2/27th was withdrawn from the fighting and in March 1944 it returned to Australia.

=== Borneo and disbandment ===
A further period of training and reorganisation followed before the 2/27th returned to operations late in the war when it was dispatched to Borneo. As part of the Operation Oboe landings, the battalion took part in an amphibious landing at Balikpapan on 1 July 1945. Coming ashore at Klandasan, the 2/27th formed the spearhead of the 21st Brigade's assault, capturing several key features overlooking the beachhead before follow-on forces passed through them and carried forward the attack. On 3 July, the battalion began patrol operations from its base around Sepinggang, to provide flank protection for the 2/14th Battalion as the 21st Brigade advanced to Manggar airfield. Throughout the campaign, the battalion's casualties were light, and hostilities were short-lived as the bombing of Hiroshima and Nagasaki and Soviet declaration of war on Japan took place only weeks after; after the initial landing, the battalion's main involvement in the campaign consisted largely of sub-unit patrol operations along the coast from Manggar. With the war over, the 2/27th was sent, along with the rest of the 21st Brigade, to Makassar in the Celebes Islands as part of the occupation force. They remained there until the beginning of February 1946, when they were relieved by Indian troops.

After five years of war, the 2/27th battalion returned to Australia in early February 1946 aboard the transport Winchester Victory, which took them to Brisbane, Queensland. The battalion was disbanded in Chermside on 18 March 1946, as part of the demobilisation process. During its war service, a total of 2,769 men served with the battalion of whom 268 were killed in action, while a further 607 were wounded. The following decorations were awarded to members of the 2/27th Battalion: two Distinguished Service Orders, three Military Crosses and one Bar, one Distinguished Conduct Medal, 17 Military Medals, and 49 Mentions in Despatches.

== Battle honours ==
The 2/27th Battalion was awarded the following battle honours:

- North Africa, Syria 1941, The Litani, Sidon, Adlun, Damour, South-West Pacific 1942–45, Kokoda Trail, Efogi–Menari, Buna–Gona, Gona, Liberation of Australian New Guinea, Ramu Valley, Shaggy Ridge, Borneo 1945, Balikpapan.

In 1961–62, the battalion's battle honours were entrusted to the 27th Battalion, and through this link are maintained by the Royal South Australia Regiment.

== Commanding officers ==
The following officers commanded the 2/27th Battalion:

- Lieutenant Colonel Murray Moten (1940–1941)
- Lieutenant Colonel Geoffrey Cooper (1942)
- Lieutenant Colonel John Bishop (1943)
- Lieutenant Colonel Keith Picken (1943–1945)

== Notes ==
Footnotes

Citations
