= Pongani Airfield =

Airport in Papua New Guinea

Coordinates: 9°04′S 148°34′E

Pongani Airfield was an aerodrome built during World War II at Pongani village Papua New Guinea.

Built by native Pongani village men, women and children, under the supervision of Australia New Guinea Administrative Unit officer Jack Wilkinson, cleared a single grass runway built on kunai field behind Pongani village.

Used by United States Army Air Forces C-47 Dakotas and Royal Australian Air Force Lockheed Hudsons, primarily for transport flights, and also as an emergency landing field.

Abandoned after the fall of Buna and the development of airfields in the Dobodura area. After World War II, the airfield was utilised by the missionaries. The airfield is overgrown with kunai grass and is disused.
