= Wanigela, Oro Province =

Village in Oro Province, Papua New Guinea

Wanigela is a village along Collingwood Bay, Papua New Guinea. The village is served by Wanigela Airport.

== History ==
Wanigela became an Allied forward staging base during World War II. Troops staged at Wanigela before troops moving to Pongani to strike the Imperial Japanese during the Battle of Buna-Gona.

Between 5 October & 6 October 1942, the Australian 2/10th Battalion of the 18th Brigade together with United States Army engineers and anti-aircraft gunners were flown from Milne Bay to Wanigela Airfield by C-47 Dakotas of United States Army Air Forces, 21st Troop Carrier Squadron and 22nd Troop Carrier Squadron of the 374th Transport Group.

On 14 October 1942, the United States Army 128th Infantry Regiment of the 32nd Infantry Division and the Australian 2/6th Independent Company were flown from 14-Mile Drome to Wanigela Airfield.
