= Dumpu, Papua New Guinea =

Coordinates: 5°53′S 145°44′E

Dumpu is a village in the upper Ramu Valley in Usino Rural LLG, Madang Province, Papua New Guinea. The village was serviced by Dumpu Airport.

== Battle of Dumpu ==
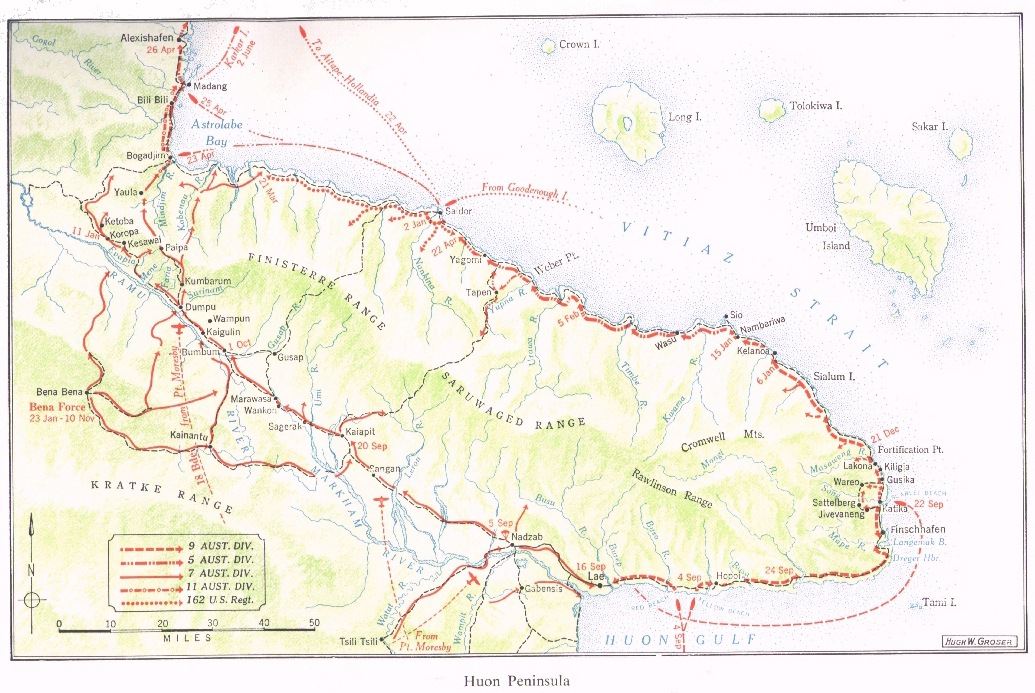
Operations on the Huon Peninsula 1943–44

During World War II the village was the site of the Battle of Dumpu from September to October 1943, resulting in an Australian victory on 4 October, after which it became the divisional headquarters of the Australian 11th Division.

An airstrip and a cemetery, dedicated 6 February 1944, were built in the vicinity.

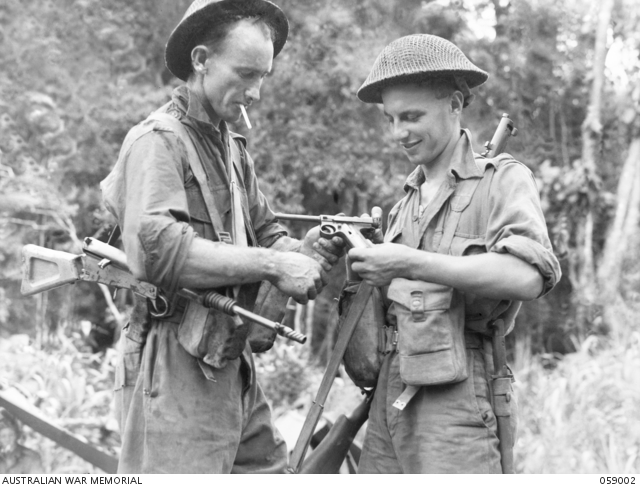
At Dumpu, New Guinea, on 15 October 1943, Corp. P.J. Carey (left) and Pvt. C.R. Fisher examine a Japanese pistol found nearby.

== Culture ==
The Dumpu or Watiwa language is spoken in the village.

As of 20 March 2022, "Dumpu has a cattle ranch station nearby."
