= Marilinan Airfield =

Coordinates: 6°50′S 146°40′E

- Part of Fifth Air Force
- Located in Morobe Province, Papua New Guinea

Site information
- Type: Military airfield
- Controlled by: United States Army Air Forces

Site history
- Built: 1943
- In use: 1943–1944

Marilinan Airfield is a former World War II airfield in Morobe Province, Papua New Guinea. The airfield was abandoned after the war and today has almost totally returned to its natural state.

== History ==
The area was occupied by Allied forces in the middle of June 1943. The field was hastily constructed by the United States Army 871st Airborne Engineers. All supplies, food, fuel and equipment had to be flown into the base via C-47s from Port Moresby.
