= Honner Force =

- Active: 1942
- Disbanded: September 1942
- Country: Australia
- Branch: Australian Army
- Type: Ad hoc composite force
- Size: approx 500 men
- Part of: 7th Division
- Engagements: World War II: New Guinea campaign
- Battle honours: No battle honours awarded

Commanders
- Notable commanders: Ralph Honner

Honner Force was the name given to an ad hoc composite Australian Army force of approximately 500 men under the command of Lieutenant Colonel Ralph Honner, which served in the New Guinea campaign in 1942 in World War II.

It was formed on 11 September 1942, under 7th Australian Division Operational Instruction Number 10 and drew manpower from the 36th, 55th Battalion and 49th Battalions, which each provided approximately a company, plus a detachment from 2/6th Independent Company. The force was sent out by the New Guinea Force via Laloki–Goldie River to cut the enemy line of communications between Menari and Nauro. Consisting mainly of eighteen- and nineteen-year-old militiamen who were barely trained and ill-equipped, Honner Force found it difficult to traverse the muddy tracks and dense jungle, however, by 19 September they had reached the vicinity of Omaramara. The majority of the men were exhausted from the march, and the aerial re-supply that had been planned for them did not eventuate. As such they were unable to move beyond the limits of which ground supply could reach them. As the strategic situation around Kokoda had stabilised by then, it was decided that the force was in no condition to conduct offensive operations and they were subsequently disbanded shortly after with the men returning to their parent units without having seen action.
