= Soputa =

Village in Papua New Guinea

Soputa is a village located inland from Gona, Buna and Sanananda in Oro province, Papua New Guinea. The village is located at the crossroads of the Kokoda-Sananada Road and Buna-Kokoda Road. Trails lead to Buna and Sananada.

== History ==
On 5 January 1943, Australian infantry and armour reached Soputa with the US Army's 32nd Division and 41st Division. A drop zone and staging area for Australian troops were located at this area during the battle of Gona.

The Australian 2/4th Field Ambulance set up a Main Dressing Station (MDS) at Soputa, inland from the fighting at Gona and Sanananda in a rubber plantation. The MDS was attacked by Japanese aircraft inflicting high casualties including 24 killed.

An Australian and United States military cemetery was located at Soputa. At the end of the war, the bodies were exhumed and reinterred elsewhere.
