= Guerilla Warfare School =

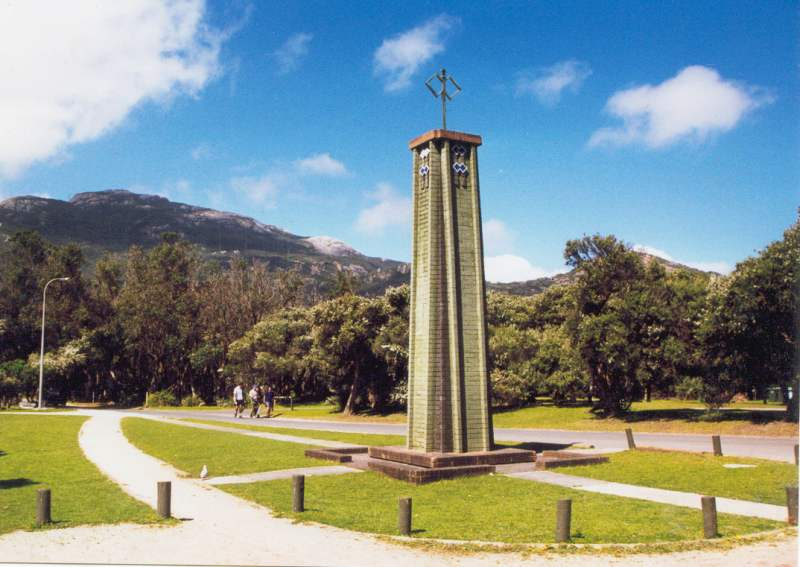
The Independent Companies Memorial at Tidal River, Wilson's Promontory

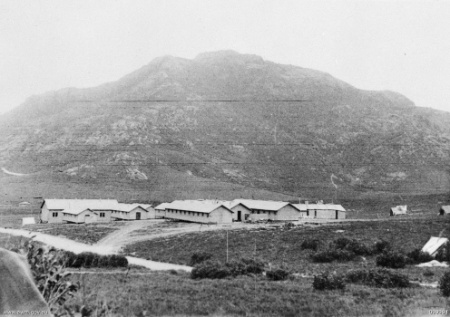
Tidal River Training Camp c.1941

The Guerilla Warfare School was a commando and special operations training centre at Tidal River, Victoria, Australia during the Second World War. The training centre was set up in 1941, known as No. 7 Infantry Training Centre, and the special operations course was run until July 1942, before transferring to the Z Experimental Station, Cairns, Queensland.

== See also ==
- Z Special Unit
