= Wanigela Airport =

- IATA: AGL; ICAO: AYWG

Summary
- Location: Wanigela, Papua New Guinea
- Coordinates: 09°20′15″S 149°09′20″E

Map
- Location of airport in Papua New Guinea

Wanigela Airport (IATA: AGL, ICAO: AYWG) is an airport in Wanigela, a village in the Oro Province (also known as Northern Province) in Papua New Guinea.

== History ==
The airfield was built by Australia New Guinea Administrative Unit authorities in July 1942 during World War II. Consisting of a single grassed runway, it was used primarily for transport flights.

== Airlines and destinations ==
PNG Air connects Wanigela Airport to Tufi Airport and Port Moresby International Airport.
