= Pongani =

Papua New Guinean village

Coordinates: 9°04′S 148°34′E

Pongani is a village on the northern coast of Papua New Guinea, located on Dyke Ackland Bay in Oro Province.

== History ==
During World War II, the area around the village served as a staging ground for Allied forces during the Battle of Buna-Gona. The United States 126th Infantry Regiment and 128th Infantry Regiment of the 32nd Infantry Division together with Australian 2/6th Independent Company, assembled in Pongani before heading towards offensives in Buna, Sanananda and Gona.

A US Army supply dump was established in the area to receive supplies by sea, and later, after the construction of Pongani Airfield, by air.
