= Kaiapit =

Coordinates: 6°16′S 146°16′E

Kaiapit is a town in Morobe Province, Papua New Guinea. The town is the capital of the Markham District and is serviced by air by Kaiapit Airport. The Battle of Kaiapit was fought at the nearby mission station.
