= Battle of the Bismarck Sea order of battle =

The Battle of the Bismarck Sea (2–4 March 1943) took place in the South West Pacific Area (SWPA) during World War II.

At midnight 28 February 1942, eight transports carrying about 6,900 troops of the Imperial Japanese Army, escorted by eight destroyers of the Imperial Japanese Navy, departed their base at Rabaul, New Britain heading for Lae, New Guinea. Through the afternoon of 1 March, the overcast weather held at which point the weather changed direction and the slow-moving task force was spotted by an Allied scout plane.

Aircraft of the U.S. 5th Air Force and the Royal Australian Air Force (RAAF) attacked the convoy, sinking all eight transports and four of the eight destroyers. The remaining destroyers with about 2,700 surviving troops limped back to Rabaul.

== Japanese forces ==
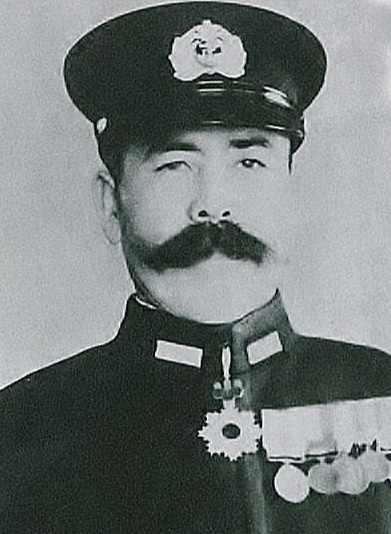
Rear Adm. Masatomi Kimura

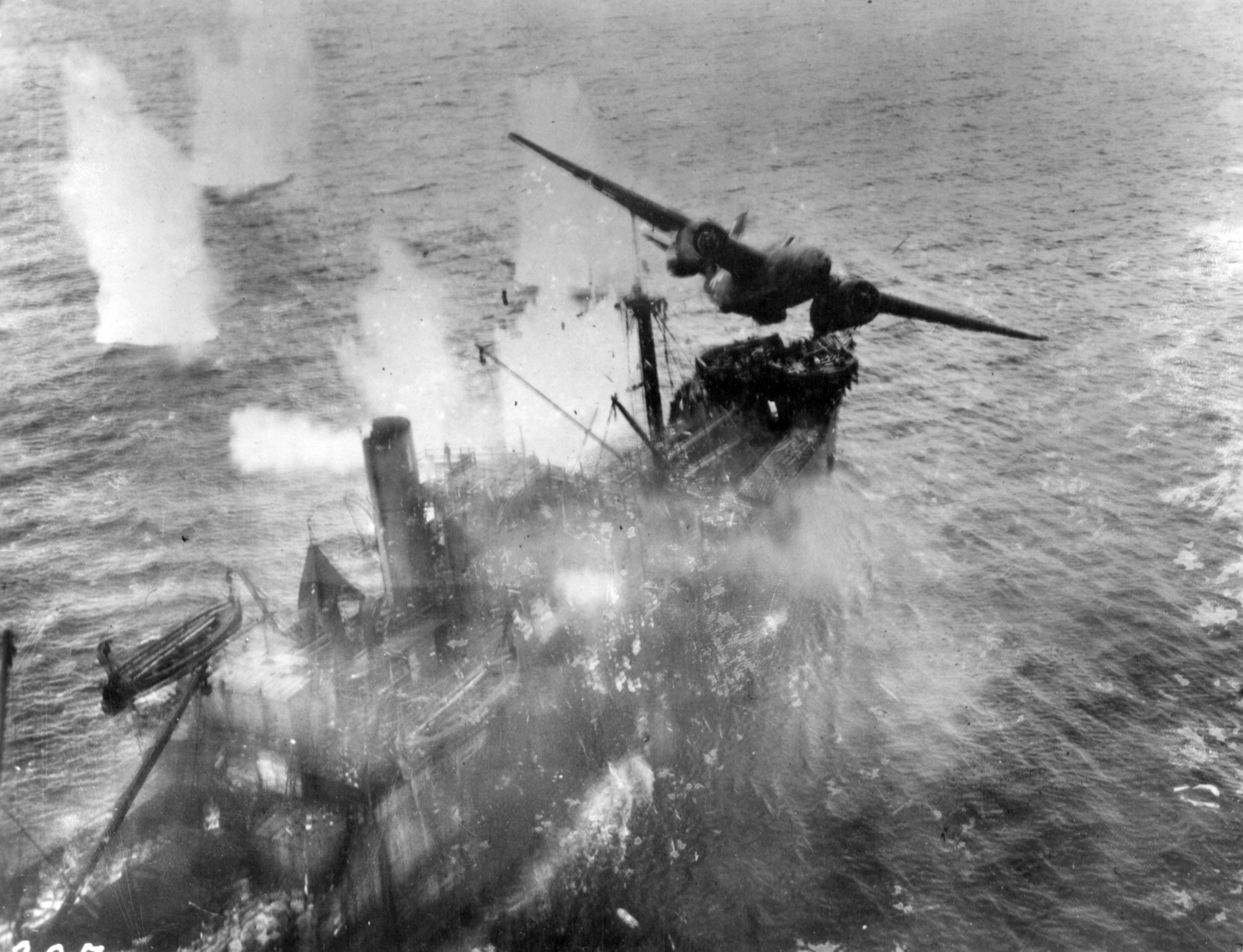
An Allied A-20 bomber attacks Japanese shipping during the Battle of the Bismarck Sea

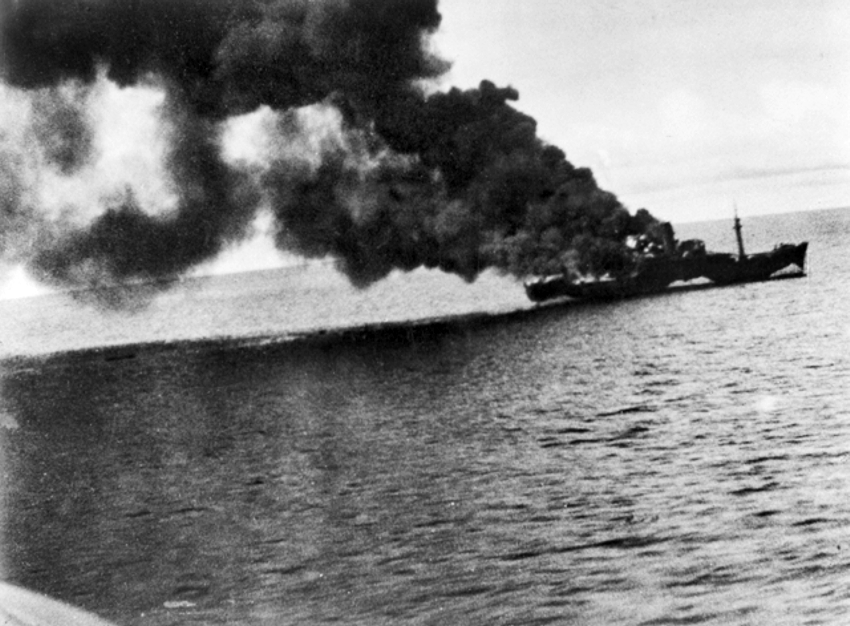
Sin-ai Maru burning after attack from Allied air power during the Battle of the Bismarck Sea

Rear Admiral Masatomi Kimura

Transports

Captain Kamataro Matsumoto

Transport	Gross tonnage	(m^{3})	Fate	No. killed
Aiyo Maru	2,716	7,686	sunk	323
Kembu Maru	950	2,688	sunk	20
Kyokusei Maru	5,493	15,545	sunk	486
Oigawa Maru	6,494	18,378	sunk	1,229
Sin-ai Maru	3,793	10,734	sunk	63+
Taimei Maru	2,883	8,159	sunk	200
Teiyo Maru	6,870	19,442	sunk	1,915
Nojima Maru	8,125	22,994	sunk	400

Embarked units
Army
Eighteenth Army Headquarters (Note: A Japanese army was equivalent to a Euro-American corps)

Eighteenth Army Signals
51st Division Headquarters
51st Division Signals
51st Engineer Regiment
14th Artillery Regiment
115th Infantry Regiment
3rd Field Hospital
21st Artillery Brigade
50th Antiaircraft Battalion
15th Independent Engineer Regiment
22nd Airfield Battalion
209th Airfield Regiment
5th Air Signals Regiment
8th Shipping Engineer Regiment
3rd Company, 5th Shipping Engineer Regiment
3rd Disembarkation Unit

Navy

Yokosuka 3rd Naval Air Defence Unit
Yokosuka 5th Special Naval Landing Party
Maizuru 2nd Special Naval Landing Party

Screen

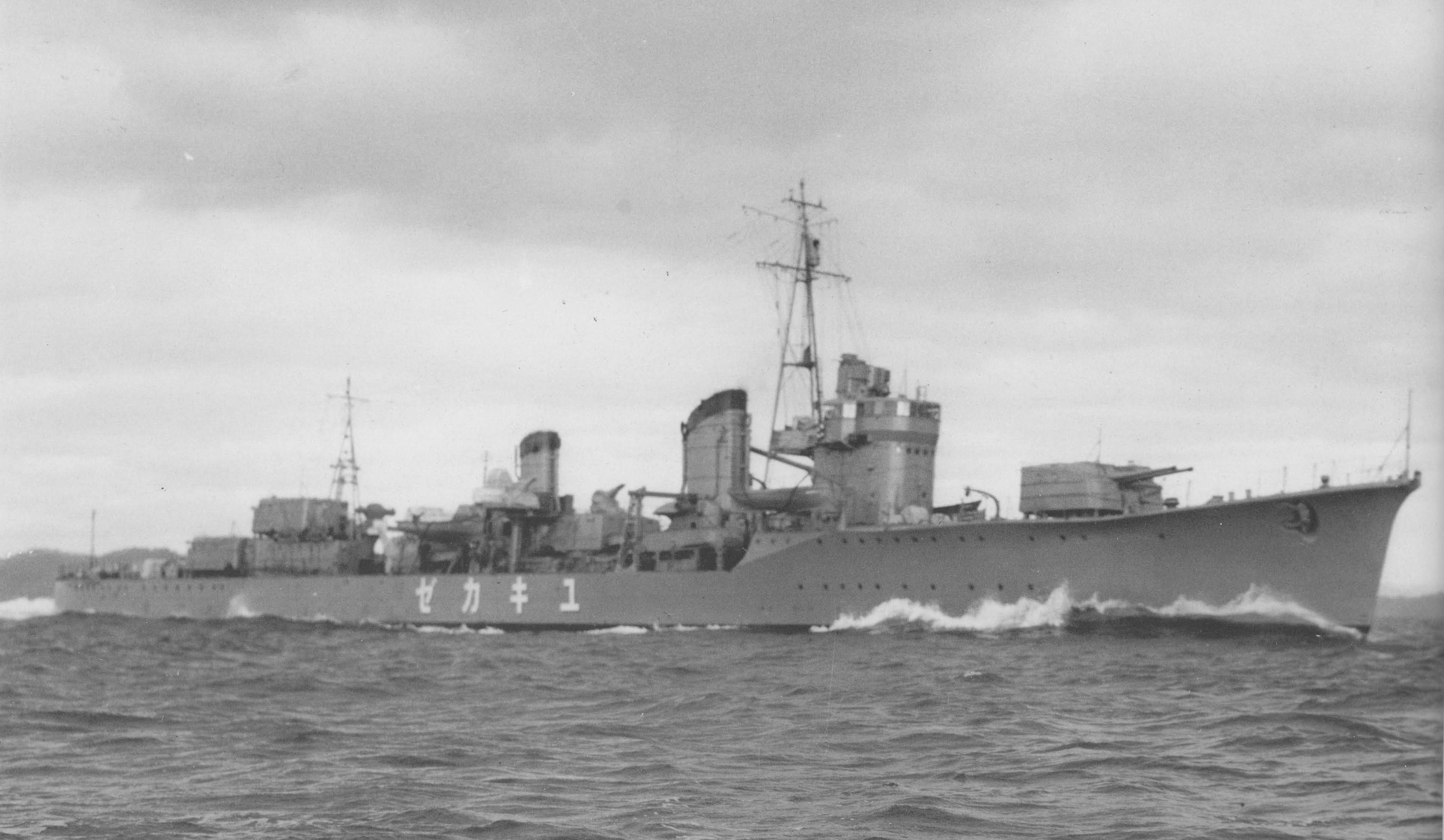
Kagerō-class destroyer

Rear Admiral Kimura

8 destroyers

2 Kagerō-class (6 × 5-in. main battery)

Tokitsukaze (Commander Masayoshi Motokura) (sunk)
Yukikaze (Commander Ryokichi Sugama)

3 Asashio-class (6 × 5-in. main battery)

Arashio (Commander Hideo Kuboki) (sunk)
Asashio (Commander Goro Yoshii) (sunk)
Asagumo (Commander Toru Iwahashi)

3 Fubuki-class (6 × 5-in. main battery)

Shikinami (Lt. Commander Akifumi Kawahashi)
Shirayuki (Commander Rokuro Sugawara) (sunk)
Uranami (Lt. Commander Chikara Hagio)

Air units
Navy

11th Air Fleet / Southeast Area Fleet

204 Air Group
252 Air Group
253 Air Group

First Air Flotilla

Zuihō Fighter Group (Kavieng)

Army

1st Flying Group (1st Hikō Sentai)
11th Flying Group (11th Hikō Sentai)

== Allied forces ==
=== Allied air forces ===
Commander, Allied Air Forces, Southwest Pacific Area/US Fifth Air Force
Lieutenant General George C. Kenney

Advanced Echelon, Allied Air Forces
Major General Ennis C. Whitehead

==== RAAF ====
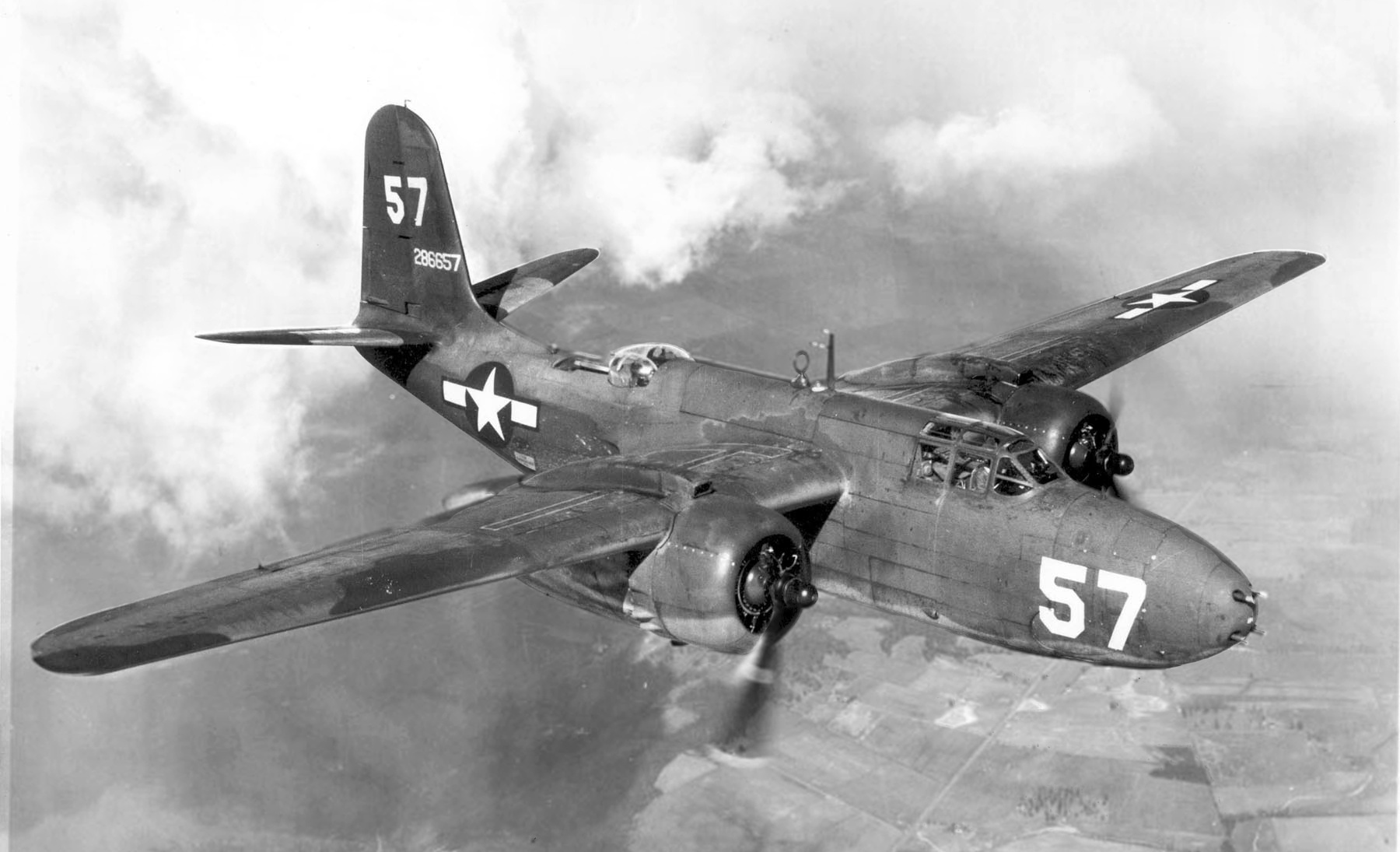
Douglas A-20 Boston

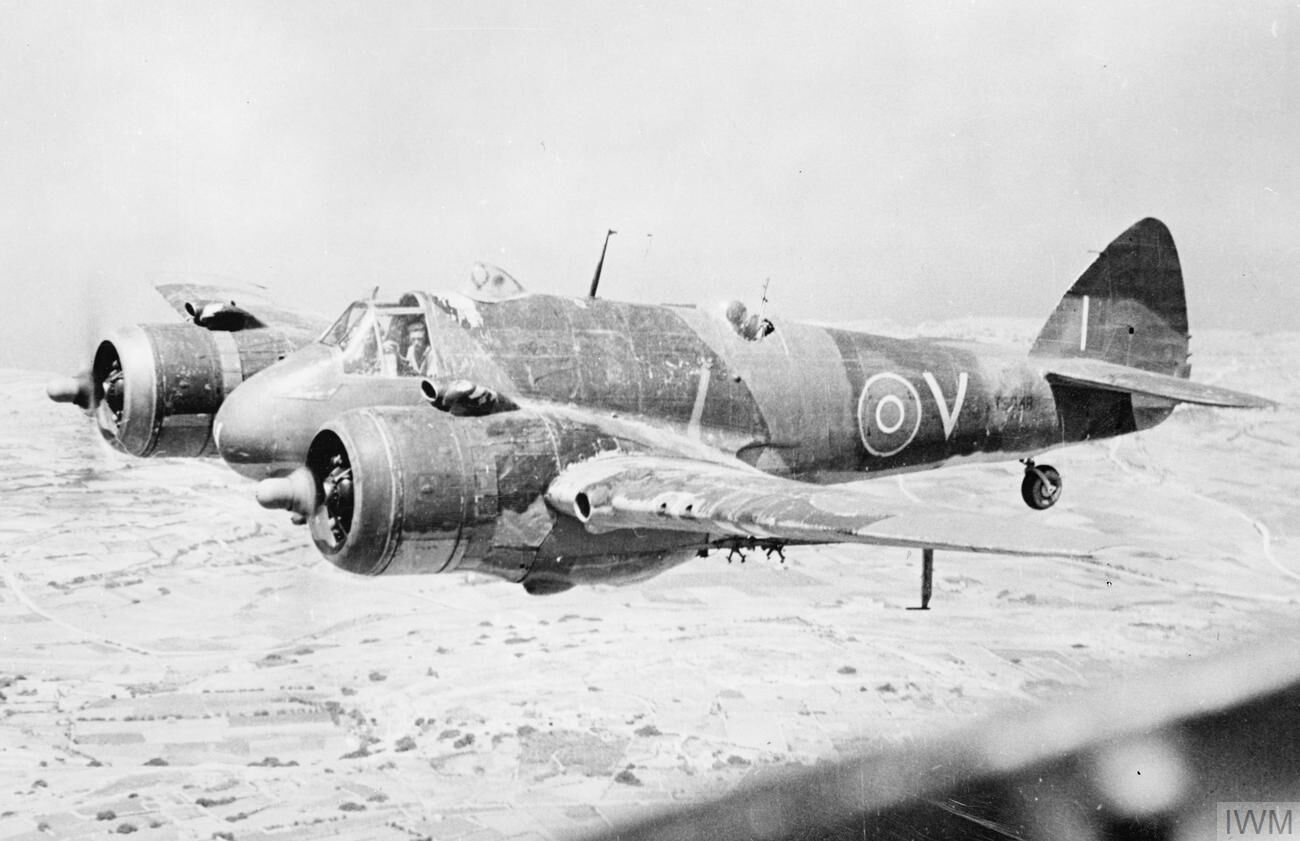
Bristol Beaufighter

No. 9 Operational Group RAAF
Air Commodore J. E. Hewitt

No. 73 Wing RAAF (Wing Commander Blake Pelly)

No. 6 Squadron RAAF (Wing Commander A. A. Barlow)

Turnbull Field: Lockheed Hudson

No. 22 Squadron RAAF (Wing Commander Keith Hampshire)

Wards Airfield: A-20 Boston

No. 30 Squadron RAAF (Wing Commander B. R. Walker)

Wards Airfield: Bristol Beaufighter

No. 71 Wing RAAF (Wing Commander Ian McLachlan)

No. 75 Squadron RAAF (Squadron Leader W. S. Arthur)

Gurney Airfield: P-40 Kittyhawk

No. 100 Squadron RAAF (Squadron Leader J. A. Smilbert (acting))

Gurney Airfield: Bristol Beaufort

==== USAAF ====
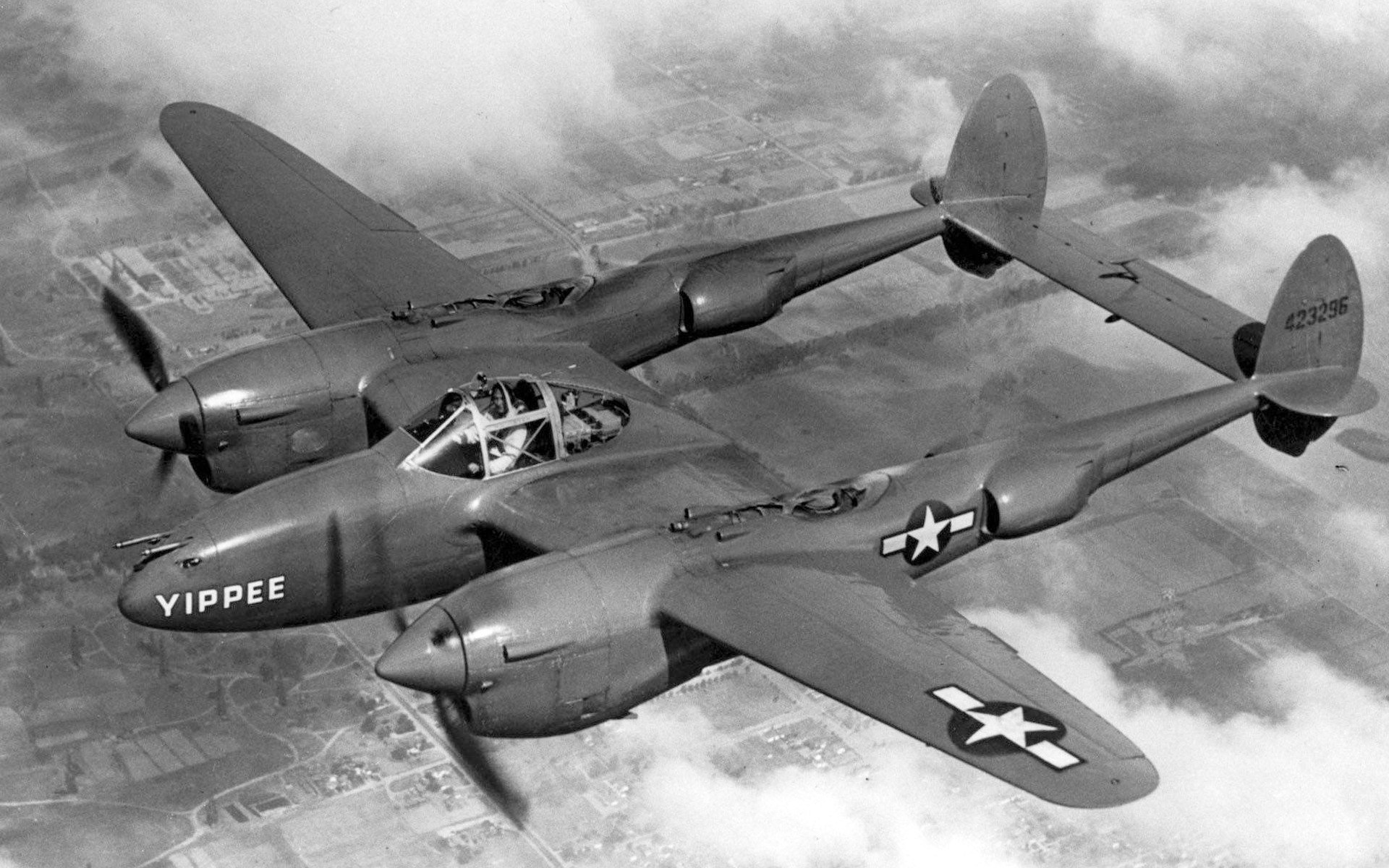
Lockheed P-38 Lightning

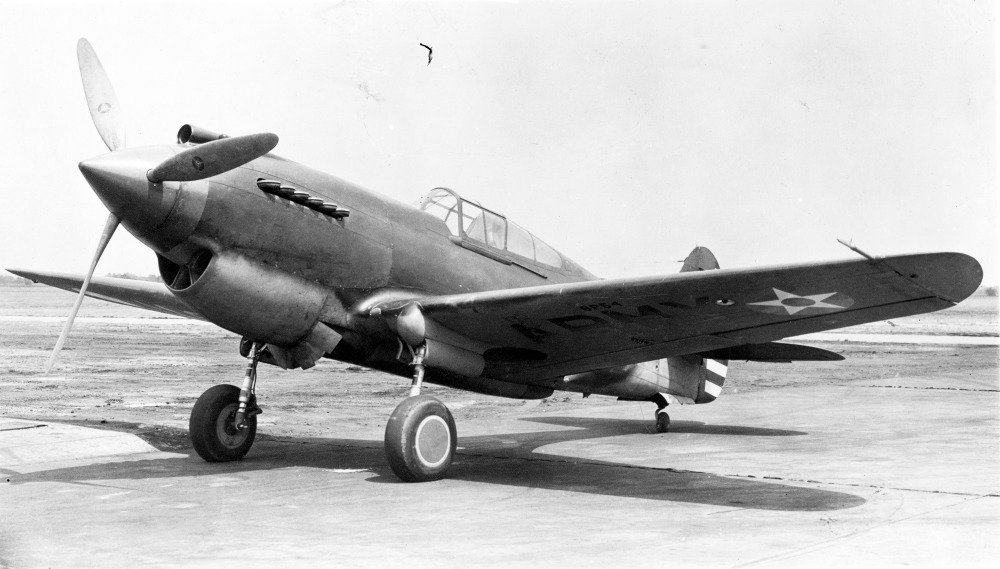
Curtiss P-40 Tomahawk

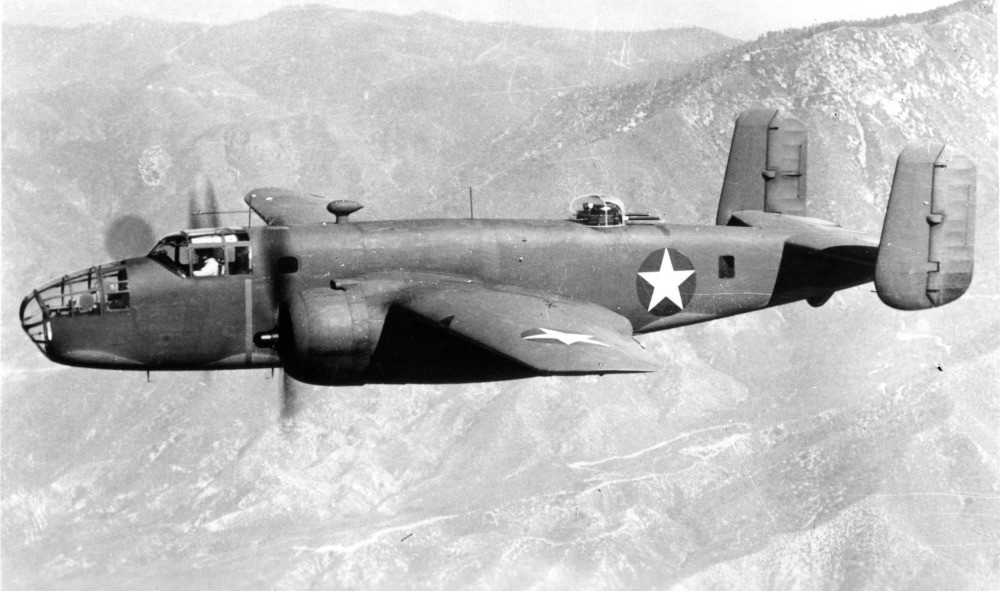
North American B-25 Mitchell

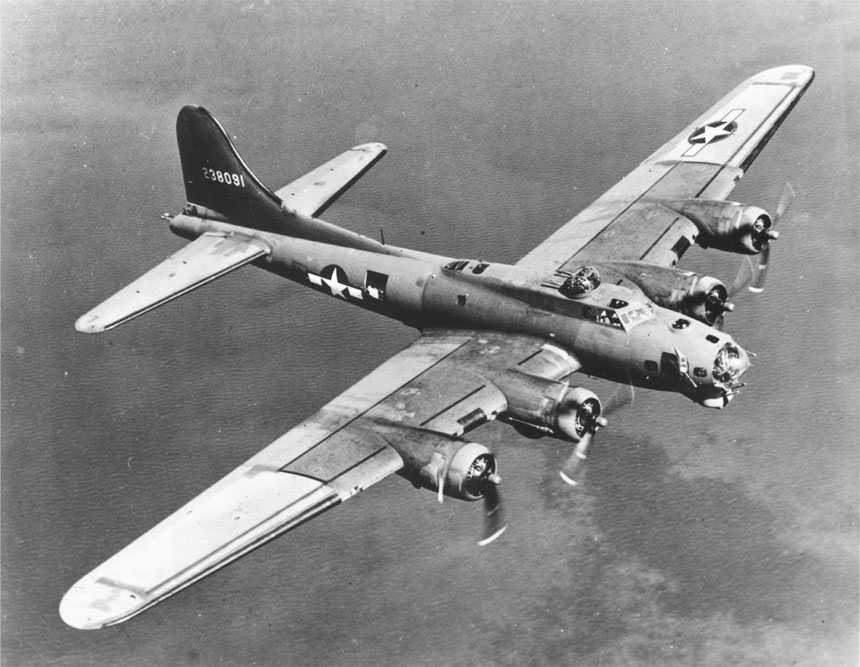
Boeing B-17 Flying Fortress

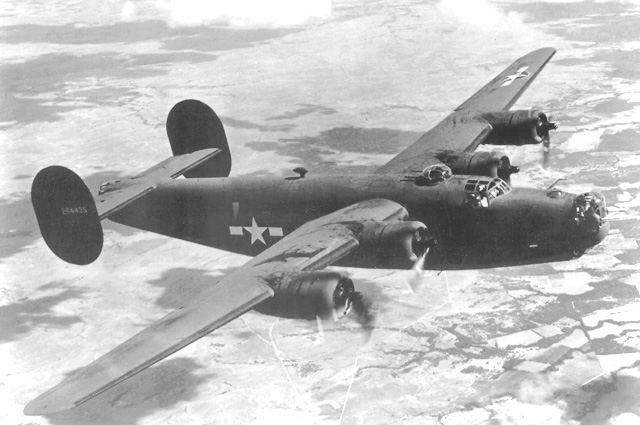
Consolidated B-24 Liberator

35th Fighter Group (Colonel Richard A. Legg)

39th Fighter Squadron (Captain T. J. Lynch)

Schwimmer Airfield: P-38 Lightning

40th Fighter Squadron (Captain Malcolm A. Moore)

Rogers Airfield: P-39 Airacobra

49th Fighter Group (Lieutenant Colonel R. L. Morrissey)

7th Fighter Squadron (Major William P. Martin)

Durand Airfield: P-40 Warhawk

8th Fighter Squadron (Major Mitchell E. Sims)

Kila Airfield: P-40 Warhawk

9th Fighter Squadron (Captain Jesse C. Peaslee)

Schwimmer Airfield: P-38 Lightning

3rd Attack Group (Lieutenant Colonel R. F. Strickland)

13th Attack Squadron (Major Harold V. Maull)

Schwimmer Airfield: B-25 Mitchell

89th Attack Squadron (Major Glen W. Clark)

Kila Airfield: A-20 Havoc

90th Attack Squadron (Major Edward L. Larner)

Durand Airfield: B-25 Mitchell

38th Bombardment Group (Colonel Fay R. Upthegrove)

71st Bombardment Squadron (Major Eugene P. Mussett)

Durand Airfield: B-25 Mitchell

405th Bombardment Squadron (Lieutenant Colonel Millard Lewis)

Durand Airfield: B-25 Mitchell

43rd Bombardment Group (Colonel Roger M. Ramey)

63rd Bombardment Squadron (Major Edward W. Scott)

Jacksons Airfield: B-17 Flying Fortress

64th Bombardment Squadron (Major Kenneth D. McCullar)

Jacksons Airfield: B-17 Flying Fortress

65th Bombardment Squadron (Major Harray J. Hawthorne)

Jacksons Airfield: B-17 Flying Fortress

403rd Bombardment Squadron (Major Jay P. Reusek)

Mareeba Airfield: B-17 Flying Fortress

90th Bombardment Group (Colonel Ralph E. Koon)

319th Bombardment Squadron (Captain Charles E. Jones)

Jacksons Airfield: B-24 Liberator

320th Bombardment Squadron (Major Roy L. Taylor)

Jacksons Airfield: B-24 Liberator

321st Bombardment Squadron (Major Cecil L. Faulkner)

Jacksons Airfield: B-24 Liberator

400th Bombardment Squadron (Major Harry J. Bullis)

Jacksons Airfield: B-24 Liberator

8th Photo Reconnaissance Squadron (1st Lieutenant F. S. Savage)

Kila Airfield: F-4 Lightning, F-5 Lightning

=== Motor Torpedo Boat Striking Force ===
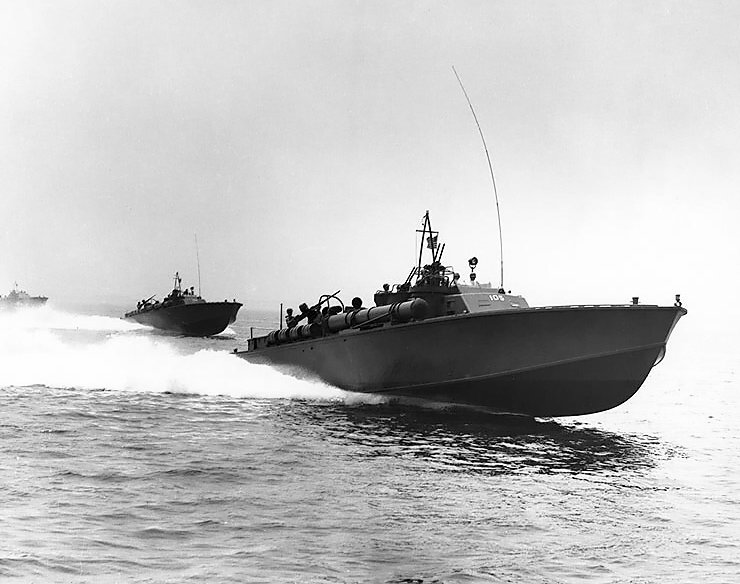
PT-105, an 80' Elco boat, underway

Lieutenant Commander Barry K. Atkins

Early Type (77 feet, 4 × 18-in. torpedo tubes)

PT-66 (Lieutenant (jg) William C. Quinby)
PT-67 (Ensign James W. Emmons)
PT-68 (Lieutenant (jg) Robert L. Childs)

Elco Type (80 feet, 4 × 21-in. torpedo tubes)

PT-121 (Ensign Edward R. Bergin)
PT-128 (Ensign James W. Herring)
PT-143 (Lieutenant (jg) John S. Bayliss)
PT-149 (Lieutenant William J. Flittie)
PT-150 (Lieutenant (jg) Russell E. Hamacheck)

== Bibliography ==
- Hata, Ikuhiko; Izawa, Yasuho; Shores, Christopher (2011). Japanese Naval Air Force Fighter Units and Their Aces 1932–1945. London: Grub Street. ISBN 9781906502843.
- Hata, Ikuhiko; Izawa, Yasuho; Shores, Christopher (2012). Japanese Army Fighter Aces 1931–45. Mechanicsburg, PA: Stackpole Books. ISBN 978-0-8117-1076-3.
- McAulay, Lex (1991). Battle of the Bismarck Sea. New York, New York: St Martins Press. ISBN 0-312-05820-9. OCLC 23082610.
- Morison, Samuel Eliot (1950). Breaking the Bismarcks Barrier. History of United States Naval Operations in World War II. Vol. VI. Boston, Massachusetts: Little Brown and Company. ISBN 0-7858-1307-1. OCLC 10310299.
- RAAF Historical Section (1995a). Volume 2 Fighter Units. Units of the Royal Australian Air Force: A Concise History. Canberra: Australian Government Publishing Service. ISBN 0-644-42795-7.
- RAAF Historical Section (1995b). Volume 3 Bomber Units. Units of the Royal Australian Air Force: A Concise History. Canberra: Australian Government Publishing Service. ISBN 0-644-42795-7.
- Silverstone, Paul H. (1970). U.S. Warships of World War II. Garden City, NY: Doubleday & Co. ISBN 978-0711003071.
