= SS Kembu Maru =

Ship name with multiple sinkings

Kembu Maru was the name of a number of ships.

- SS Kembu Maru a 915 GRT coaster sunk on 1 March 1943 in the Battle of the Bismarck Sea.
- SS Kembu Maru, a 6,816 GRT cargo ship sunk on 4 December 1943 at Kwajalein Atoll.
