= SS Pruth =

A number of steamships have been named SS Pruth:

- SS Pruth (1905), captured and scuttled by the German light cruiser SMS Karlsruhe on 9 October 1914.
- SS Pruth (1916), wrecked in 1923.
