= Skip bombing =

Bombing procedure

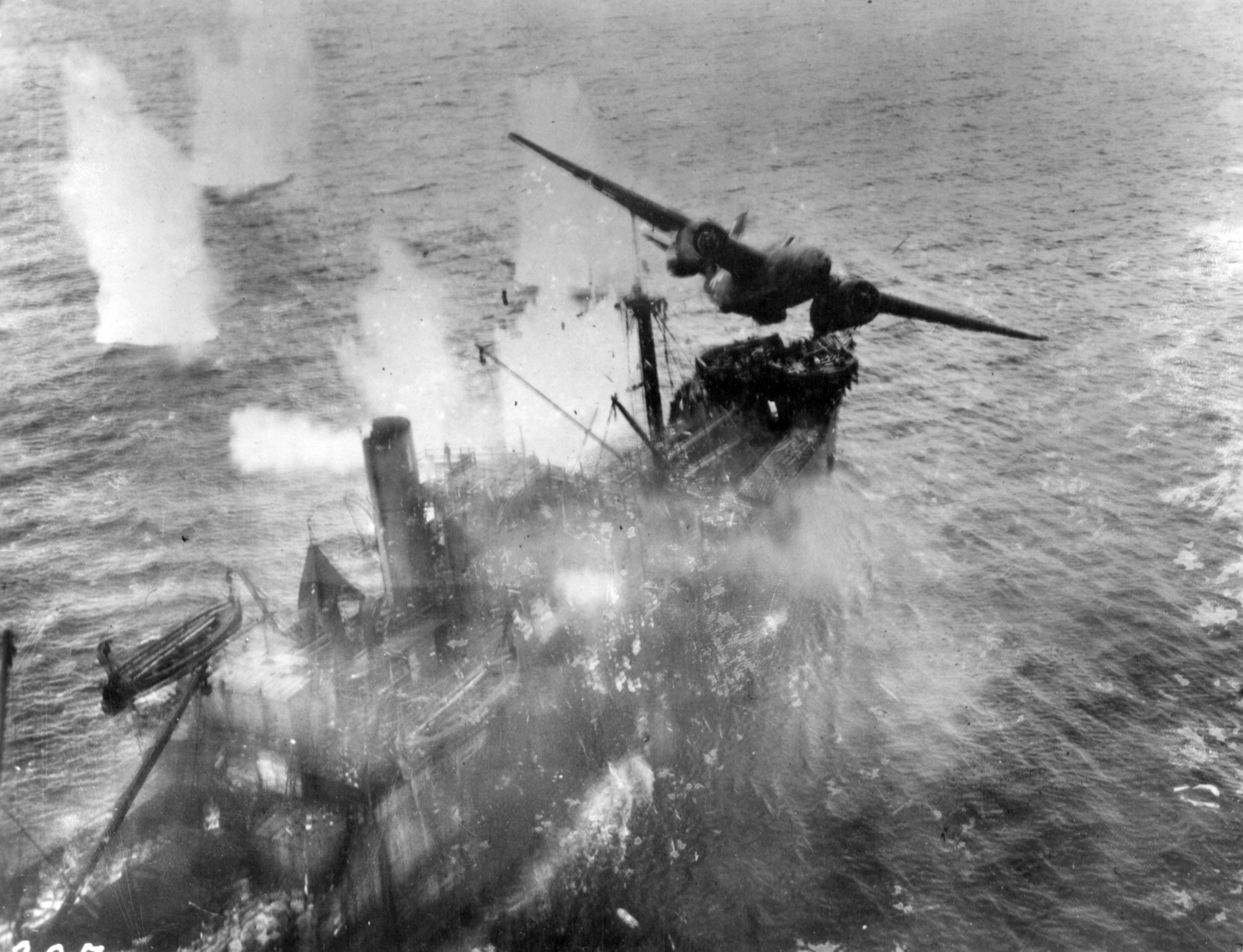
U.S. A-20 Havoc of the 89th Squadron, 3rd Attack Group, at the moment it clears the Japanese merchant ship Taiei Maru following a successful skip-bombing attack. Wewak, New Guinea, March 1944

Skip bombing, a low-altitude bombing technique, emerged independently in several of the combatant air forces in World War II, notably Italy, Australia, Britain, the Soviet Union and the United States. It allows an aircraft to attack shipping by skipping a bomb across the water like a stone. Dropped at very low altitudes, the bomb never rises more than about 5 metres (16 ft) above the surface of the water, ensuring that it will hit the side of the target ship as long as it is aimed correctly.

The technique required the aircraft to fly at very low altitudes directly at the target ship, making shooting down the attacking aircraft easier. In the immediate pre-war era air forces devoted considerable effort to develop new bombsights that would allow the aircraft to bomb from higher altitudes. The most notable, the US Navy's Norden bombsight, was fitted to most US Navy aircraft. In practice, Norden bombsights proved largely useless, and the skip-bombing technique was soon introduced operationally.

After the attack on Pearl Harbor in December 1941, Major William Benn of the 63rd Squadron, 43rd Bomb Group (Heavy), Fifth Air Force, United States Army Air Forces notably used skip bombing against Imperial Japanese Navy warships and transports in the Southwest Pacific area theater during World War II. General George Kenney has been credited as the first American to use skip bombing with the U.S. Army Air Forces.

The Royal Air Force famously used skip bombing in May 1943 in Operation Chastise — known as the Dambuster raid. This used specially-designed barrel-shaped bouncing bombs that used backspin to skip along the water and attack the target dams.

== Technique ==
The bombing aircraft flew at very low altitudes (200–250 ft (61–76 m)) at speeds from 200–250 mph (320–400 km/h; 170–220 kn). They would release a "stick" of two to four bombs, usually 500 lb (230 kg) or 1,000 lb (450 kg) bombs preferably equipped with four- to five-second time delay fuzes. The bombs would "skip" over the surface of the water in a manner similar to stone skipping and either bounce into the side of the ship and detonate, or submerge and explode next to the ship, or bounce over the target and miss. Unlike the Upkeep or Highball devices, this technique used standard bomb types, although only bombs with a generally hemispherical nose—as all regular American World War II general purpose aircraft bombs had—would bounce off the water surface properly.

A similar technique was mast-height bombing, in which bombers would approach the target at low altitude, 200 to 500 feet (61 to 152 m), at about 265 to 275 miles per hour (426 to 443 km/h), and then drop down to mast height, 10 to 15 feet (3.0 to 4.6 m) at about 600 yards (550 m) from the target. They would release their bombs at around 300 yards (270 m), aiming directly at the side of the ship. In practice, the techniques were often combined: a bomber would drop two bombs, skipping the first and launching the second at mast height. The Battle of the Bismarck Sea would demonstrate the effectiveness of these low-level attacks on ships. Practice missions were carried out against the SS Pruth, a liner that had run aground in 1923.

=== Aircraft ===
Various aircraft types were used for skip-bombing attacks, including B-17 Flying Fortress heavy bombers, B-25 Mitchell medium bombers, and A-20 Havoc attack bombers. These were supported by heavily armed Royal Australian Air Force Bristol Beaufighters, which would suppress Japanese antiaircraft fire with their machine guns and cannon. The Soviets used lend-leased A-20 Havocs and P-40 Tomahawks as well as Il-2 Sturmoviks (also used for air defence suppression). Skip bombers were often used by aviation of the Soviet Northern Fleet in combination with torpedo bombers (usually the same A-20 aircraft, skip bombers and torpedo bombers operated in pairs). Skip bombers were called "topmachtoviks" (топмачтовики) in Russian, because they were flying "at the level of ship mast tops".

== Advantages and disadvantages ==
Skip bombing carried several advantages. Unguided, unpowered bombs are vastly cheaper than torpedoes of equivalent explosive power. Torpedoes take up to several minutes to reach their targets after launch, enough time for an agile ship with an attentive crew to turn and avoid the attack or minimize its damage; skipped bombs, however, reach their targets in seconds. Skip bombing is additionally carried out at high speeds, increasing bombers' chances of surviving anti-aircraft fire as aerial torpedoes of the era were dropped at relatively low speeds.

The main drawback of skip bombing was that it took a great deal of skill to perfect; sometimes the bombs would detonate too soon, or in some cases, sink too deep before its delay-fuzed explosion.

== History ==
The first use of low-altitude bombing in WWII properly belongs to the British. On September 4, 1939, 15 British Bristol Blenheim bombers assaulted a group of German vessels near Wilhelmshaven, Germany. From an altitude of 100 feet (30 m), the aircraft crews dropped their bombs straight onto the decks of the ships—not skipped them up to or into the hulls. These first efforts failed to sink the ships because the bombs had insufficient time to arm before impact. They did, however, demonstrate the precision of a low-altitude attack. The British continued to use low-altitude techniques and eventually began to incorporate skip bombing into their tactics.

Although historically, American skip bombing started with the prewar attack doctrine espoused by General George Kenney, practically, it began on August 26, 1941, when General Henry "Hap" Arnold, Chief of the Army Air Forces (US), heard details of a British skip bombing attack at an Allied conference in England. Upon his return from England, General Arnold charged developmental teams at Eglin Army Airfield, Florida with the task of creating an American version of skip bombing.

Major William Benn, General Kenney's aide, had witnessed some of the testing at Eglin during the summer of 1942. In July of that year, Kenney and Benn conducted their own ad hoc experiment in Nadi, Fiji on Kenney's way to take command of the Fifth Army Air Force based in Australia. In late September 1942, Major Benn, then commanding the 63d BS of the 43d Bombardment Group, was using a wrecked ship, SS Pruth, sitting on a reef outside Port Moresby Harbor for skip bombing training.

By the time the Eglin Airfield test results were released in December 1942, Benn and the 63d BS, 43d BG, Fifth Army Air Force had already put low-altitude and skip bombing into practice. The first time skip bombing was used in action by U.S. pilots was against Japanese warships at Rabaul on New Britain on the night of October 22–23, 1942, where B-17 heavy bombers attacked and destroyed the enemy vessels. With the continuing success against shipping in Rabaul Harbor throughout October and November 1942, both the tactic and the term "skip bombing" had become popular in the Fifth Army Air Force. Another notable use of this technique was during the Battle of the Bismarck Sea, March 2–4, 1943, when aircraft of the U.S. Fifth Air Force and the Royal Australian Air Force (RAAF) attacked and largely destroyed a Japanese troop convoy off the northern coast of New Guinea.

== See also ==
- Index of aviation articles
- Bouncing bomb
- Toss bombing
- Low Level Bombsight, Mark III
