= Patrol torpedo boat PT-143 =

Torpedo boat of the United States Navy

History

United States
- Name: PT-143
- Builder: Electric Launch Company, Bayonne, New Jersey
- Laid down: 13 July 1942
- Launched: 25 September 1942
- Completed: 13 October 1942
- Decommissioned: 28 October 1945
- Nickname(s): "Ring Dang Doo"
- Fate: intentionally destroyed due to obsolescence
- Notes: Call sign: NYCP

General characteristics
- Class & type: Elco 80-foot PT boat
- Displacement: 56 long tons (57 t)
- Length: 80 ft (24 m)
- Beam: 20 ft 8 in (6.30 m)
- Draft: 5 ft (1.5 m)
- Propulsion: 3 × 1,500 shp (1,119 kW) Packard W-14 M2500 gasoline engines, three shafts
- Speed: 41 knots (76 km/h; 47 mph)
- Complement: 17 (3 officers, 14 enlisted)
- Armament: 4 × 21 in (533 mm) torpedoes; 1 × 40 mm guns; 2 × twin .50 cal (12.7 mm) machine guns

PT-143 was a PT-103-class motor torpedo boat of the United States Navy that served during World War II.

== History ==
PT-143 was ordered by the United States Navy and laid down on 13 July 1942 at the Elco Works of the Electric Launch Company (now Electric Boat Company) at their Bayonne, New Jersey shipyard; launched on 25 September 1942; and completed on 13 October 1942. She was commissioned and assigned to Motor Torpedo Boat Squadron 8 (MTBRon 8) under the command of Lieutenant Commander Barry K. Atkins, USN. MTBRon 8 then consisted of PT-143 along with PT-66, PT-67, PT-68, PT-142, PT-143, PT-144, PT-145, PT-146, PT-147, PT-148, PT-149, and PT-150. The squadron was assigned to the Southwest Pacific where it operated out of PT boat bases at Tufi, Morobe, Kiriwina Island, Aitape, Mios Woendi, Dreger Harbor, and Kana Kopa (Milne Bay) on New Guinea; at Rein Bay and Talasea on New Britain; and at Mangarin Bay (Mindoro Island), San Pedro Bay (Leyte Island), and Tawi Tawi off Borneo in the Philippines. In January 1943, PTs 144–148 were transferred to MTBRon 2 and replaced in April 1943 by PT-113 and PT-114 from MTBRon 2 along with PT-120, PT-121, and PT-122 from MTBRon 6; and PT-110 also from MTBRon 2 in June 1943.

In the early morning of 4 March 1943, during the Battle of Bismarck Sea, 10 PT boats under Atkins were sent to attack the surviving convoy off Lae. PT-119 and PT-132 hit flotsam and had to return to base while PT-143 (under Lieutenant Junior Grade John S. Baylis USNR) with PT-66, PT-67, PT-68, PT-121, PT-128 (MTBRon 7), PT-149, and PT-150 continued on. PT-143 and PT-150 spotted the burning transport ship Oigawa Maru, and each successfully fired a torpedo sinking the ship. 78 crewmen and 1,151 troops of the 51st Division were killed.

On 28 October 1945 at Samar, Philippines, PT-143 was decommissioned, stripped of usable items, and destroyed by U.S. military personnel.
