= SS Kyokusei Maru =

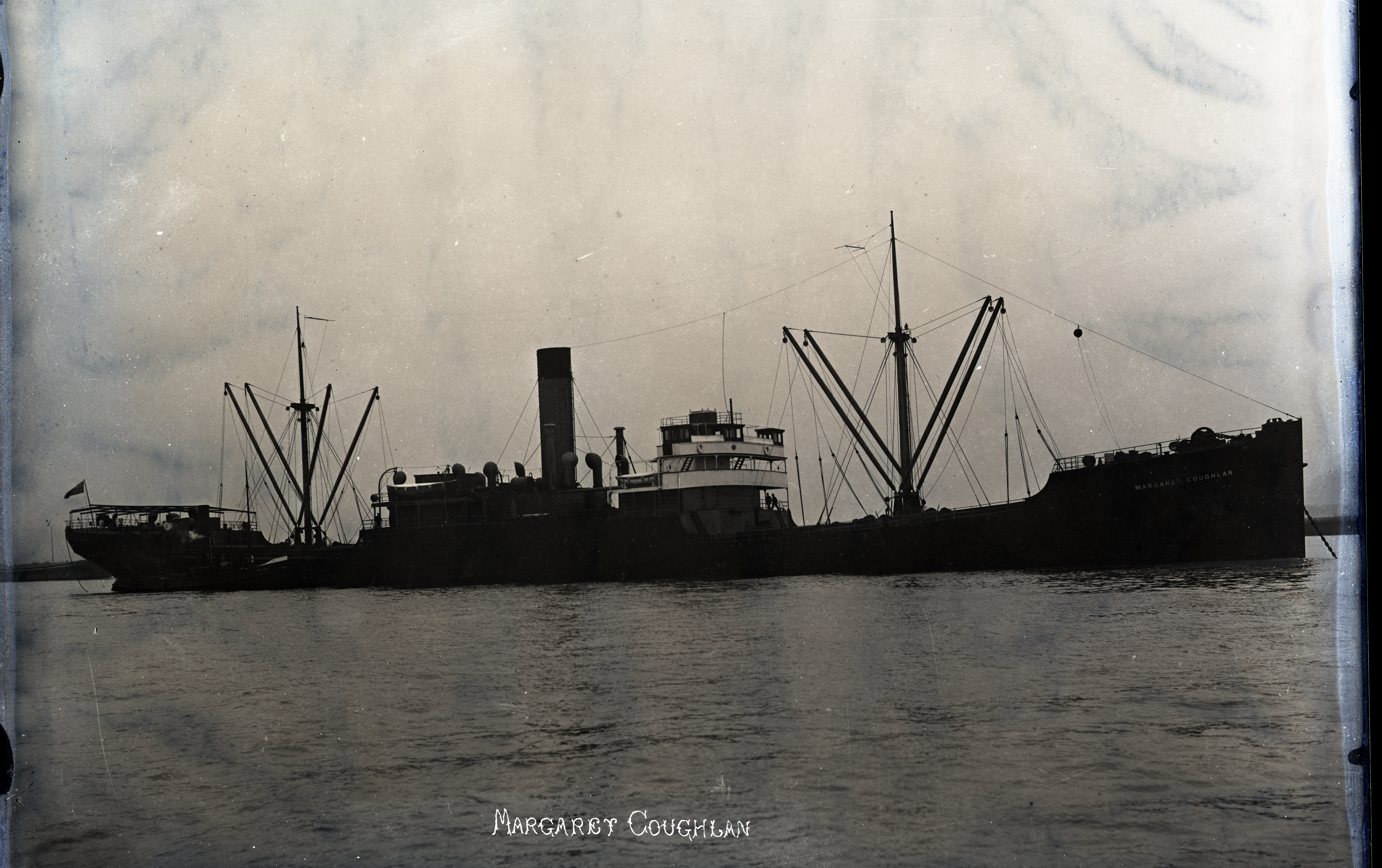
- Margaret Coughlan

History
- Name: Margaret Coughlan (1920-1924); Chilcop (1924-1936); Shun Hwa (1936-1938); Kyokusei Maru (1938-1943)
- Owner: Western Canada Steamship Company, Vancouver; Atlantic Steamship Company, Vancouver; Sheridan Steamship Company, London; Chile Steamship Company, New York; K. King, China; Asashi Shoki K.K., Tokyo
- Builder: J. Coughlan & Sons, Vancouver
- Yard number: 15
- Launched: June 1920
- Fate: Sunk by aircraft on 2 March 1943 at 06°40'S, 147°10'E

General characteristics
- Tonnage: 5,493 GRT
- Length: 410.5 feet (125.1 m)
- Beam: 54 feet (16 m)
- Draught: 29.7 feet (9.1 m)
- Installed power: 520 NHP
- Propulsion: Triple expansion engines built by J. G Kinkold & Co, Greenoch

SS Kyokusei Maru (Kanji:旭盛丸) was a 3,794 GRT transport ship of the Imperial Japanese Army during World War II.

Built by J. Coughlan & Sons, Vancouver and launched in June 1920, as Margaret Coughlan for the Western Canada Steamship Company. She was renamed Chilcop in 1924, Shun Hwa (盛華) in 1936, and Kyokusei Maru in 1938.

She left Rabaul, New Britain on 1 March 1943, as part of Operation 81, carrying a cargo 1,200 troops of the 115th Infantry Regiment, equipment, fuel, landing craft and ammunition for Lae, New Guinea. The convoy was attacked by aircraft of the United States Army Air Forces and Royal Australian Air Force from 2 March 1943, known as the Battle of the Bismarck Sea. Kyokusei Maru was bombed by B-17s of the 64th Bombardment Squadron on 2 March and sank at 06°40′S 147°10′E, the first ship in the Japanese convoy sunk during the battle. The destroyers Yukikaze and Asagumo plucked 950 survivors from the water. The two destroyers landed the survivors at Lae. The rest of the 486 soldiers and sailors on board were killed.
