= Sin-ai Maru (1921) =

Imperial Japanaese transport ship

History

Japan
- Name: Shin-ai Maru (1921-1938); Sin-ai Maru (1938-1943)
- Owner: Kishimoto Kisen K.K.
- Builder: Fujimagata Dockyard, Osaka
- Launched: 1921
- Completed: March 1921
- Fate: Sunk by aircraft on 3 March 1943 at 07°15'S, 148°30'E

General characteristics
- Tonnage: 3,794 GRT; 2,305 NRT
- Length: 345 feet (105 m)
- Beam: 50 feet (15 m)
- Draught: 29 feet (8.8 m)
- Installed power: 342 NHP
- Propulsion: Triple expansion engines

Sin-ai Maru, also known as Shin-ai Maru, was a 3,794 ton transport ship of the Imperial Japanese Army during World War II.

Built by Fujimagata Dockyard, Osaka and launched in 1921 as Shin-ai Maru. She was renamed Sin-ai Maru in 1938.

She left Rabaul, New Britain on 1 March 1943, as part of Operation 81, carrying a cargo of troops, equipment, fuel, landing craft and ammunition for Lae, New Guinea. The convoy was attacked by aircraft of the United States Army Air Forces and Royal Australian Air Force from 2 March 1943, known as the Battle of the Bismarck Sea. Sin-ai Maru was bombed on 3 March and sank at 07°15'S., 148°30'E.
18 crew, 45 gunners and an unknown number of troops were KIA.
