= Battle of the Bismarck Sea =

1943 Allied attack on a Japanese convoy

Coordinates: 07°15′S 148°15′E

- Part of the New Guinea campaign of the Pacific Theater (World War II)
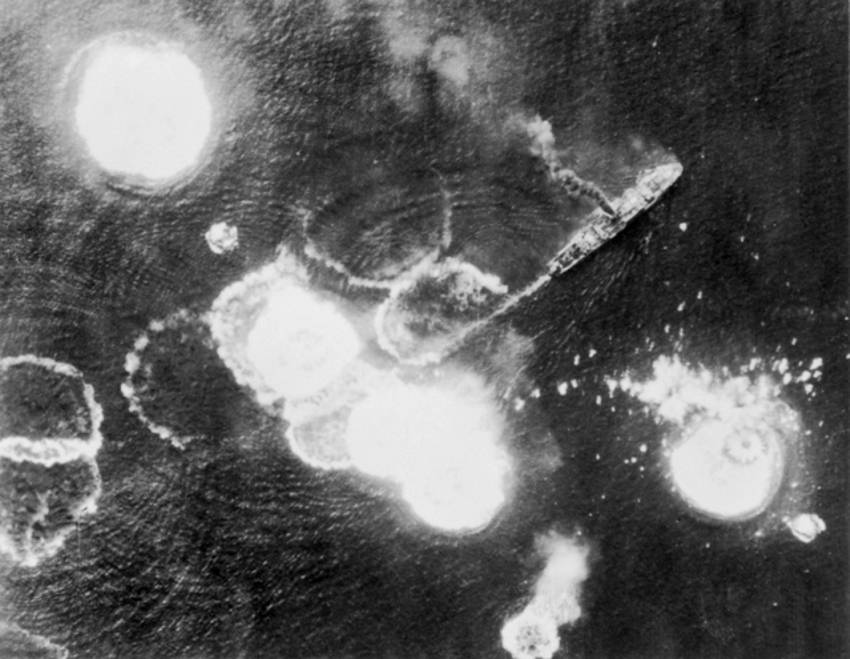
- Japanese transport under aerial attack in the Bismarck Sea, 3 March 1943
Date	2–4 March 1943
Location	Bismarck Sea, in the vicinity of Lae
Result	Allied victory

Belligerents
United States; Australia	Japan

Commanders and leaders
(United States) Ennis Whitehead (Australia) Joe Hewitt	(Empire of Japan) Gunichi Mikawa (Empire of Japan) Masatomi Kimura

Strength
39 heavy bombers; 41 medium bombers; 34 light bombers; 54 fighters 10 torpedo boats	8 destroyers, 8 troop transports, 100 aircraft

Casualties and losses
2 bombers destroyed, 4 fighters destroyed, 13 killed	8 transports sunk, 4 destroyers sunk, 15 fighters destroyed (Eight Navy Type 0 fighters and seven Army Type 1 fighters), 2,890+ dead

The Battle of the Bismarck Sea (2–4 March 1943) took place in the South West Pacific Area (SWPA) during World War II when aircraft of the U.S. Fifth Air Force and the Royal Australian Air Force (RAAF) attacked a Japanese convoy carrying troops to Lae, New Guinea, as part of Operation 81. Most of the Japanese task force was destroyed, and Japanese troop losses were heavy.

The Japanese convoy was a result of a Japanese Imperial General Headquarters decision in December 1942 to reinforce their position in the South West Pacific theatre. A plan was devised to move some 6,900 troops from Rabaul directly to Lae. The plan was understood to be risky, because Allied air power in the area was strong, but the Japanese decided to proceed because otherwise, the troops would have to be landed a considerable distance away and march through inhospitable swamp, mountain, and jungle terrain without roads before reaching their destination. On 28 February 1943, the convoy – comprising eight destroyers and eight troop transports with an escort of about 100 fighter aircraft – set out from Simpson Harbour in Rabaul.

The Allies had detected preparations for the convoy, and naval codebreakers in Melbourne (FRUMEL) and Washington, DC, had decrypted and translated messages indicating the convoy's intended destination and date of arrival. The Allied Air Forces had developed new techniques, such as skip bombing, that they hoped would improve the chances of a successful air attack on ships. They detected and shadowed the convoy, which came under sustained air attack on 2–3 March 1943. Follow-up attacks by PT boats and aircraft were made on 4 March on lifeboats and rafts. All eight transports and four of the escorting destroyers were sunk. Of 6,900 troops who were badly needed in New Guinea, only about 1,200 made it to Lae. Another 2,700 were rescued by destroyers and submarines and returned to Rabaul. The Japanese made no further attempts to reinforce Lae by ship, greatly hindering their unsuccessful efforts to stop Allied offensives in New Guinea.

== Background ==
=== Allied offensives ===
Six months after Imperial Japan attacked Pearl Harbor in December 1941, the United States won a strategic victory at the Battle of Midway in June 1942. Seizing the strategic initiative, the United States and its Allies landed on Guadalcanal in the southern Solomon Islands in August 1942, beginning the Solomon Islands Campaign. The battle for Guadalcanal ended in victory for the Allies with the withdrawal of Japanese forces from the island in early February 1943. At the same time, Australian and American forces in New Guinea repelled the Japanese land offensive along the Kokoda Track. Going on the offensive, the Allied forces captured Buna–Gona, destroyed Japanese forces in that area.

The ultimate goal of the Allied counteroffensives in New Guinea and the Solomons was to capture the main Japanese base at Rabaul on New Britain, later codified as Operation Cartwheel, and clear the way for the eventual reconquest of the Philippines. Recognizing the threat, the Japanese continued to send land, naval, and aerial reinforcements to the area in an attempt to check the Allied advances.

=== Japanese plans ===
Reviewing the progress of the Battle of Guadalcanal and the Battle of Buna–Gona in December 1942, the Japanese faced the prospect that neither could be held. Accordingly, Imperial General Headquarters decided to take steps to strengthen the Japanese position in the SWPA by sending Lieutenant General Jusei Aoki's 20th Division from Korea to Guadalcanal and Lieutenant General Heisuke Abe's 41st Division from China to Rabaul. Lieutenant General Hitoshi Imamura, the commander of the Japanese Eighth Area Army at Rabaul, ordered Lieutenant General Hatazō Adachi's XVIII Army to secure Madang, Wewak, and Tuluvu in New Guinea. On 29 December, Adachi ordered the 102nd Infantry Regiment and other units under the command of Major General Tōru Okabe, the commander of the infantry group of the 51st Division, to move from Rabaul to Lae and advance inland to capture Wau. After deciding to evacuate Guadalcanal on 4 January, the Japanese switched priorities from the Solomon Islands to New Guinea, and opted to send the 20th and 41st Divisions to Wewak.

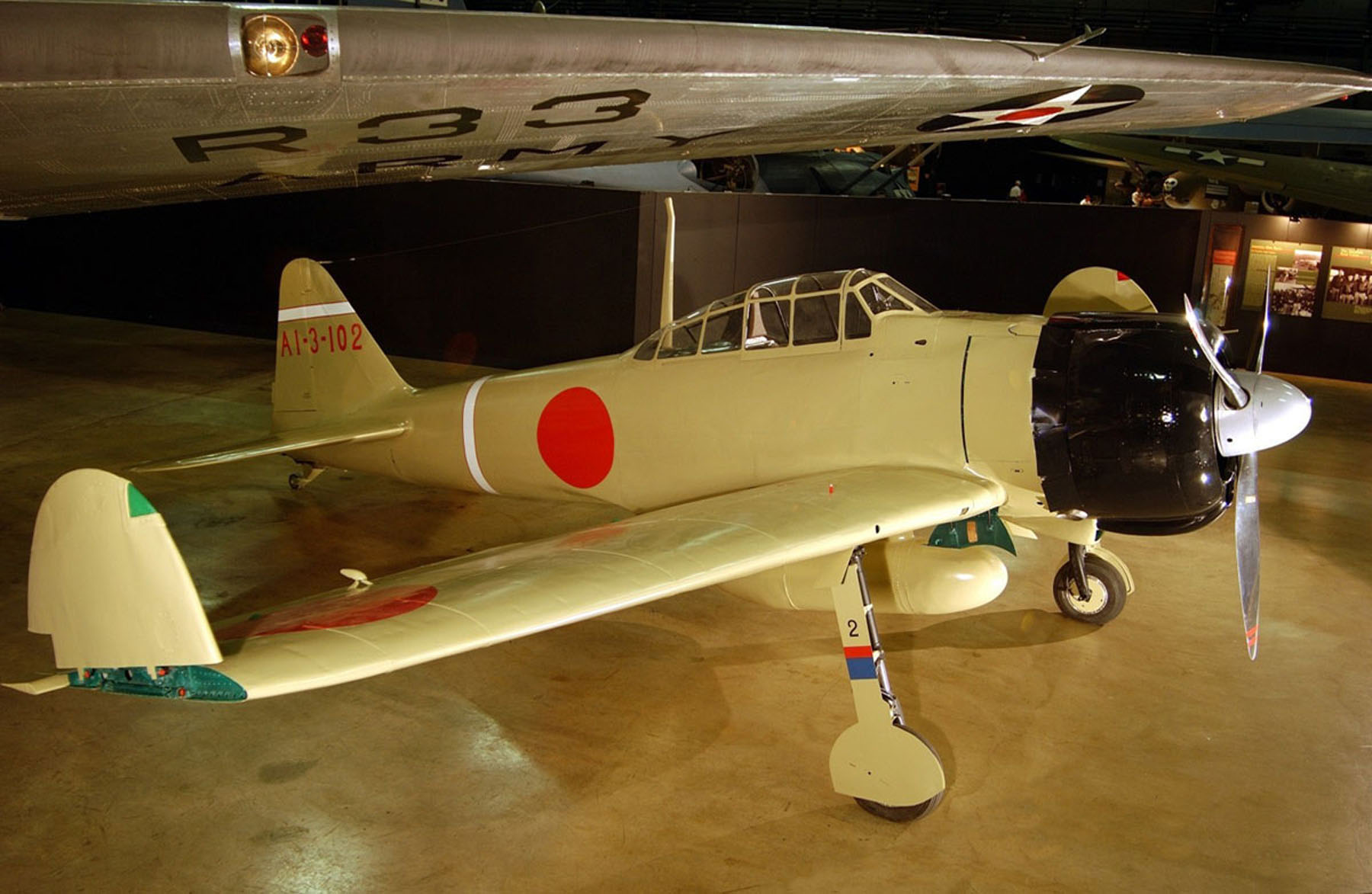
A Mitsubishi A6M Zero, painted to represent a section leader's aircraft from the Japanese aircraft carrier Zuihō during the Battle of the Bismarck Sea

On 5 January 1943, the convoy, which consisted of five destroyers and five troop transports carrying Okabe's force, set out for Lae from Rabaul. Forewarned by Ultra, United States Army Air Forces (USAAF) and Royal Australian Air Force (RAAF) aircraft spotted, shadowed, and attacked the convoy, which was shielded by low clouds and Japanese fighters. The Allies claimed to have shot down 69 Japanese aircraft for the loss of 10 of their own. An RAAF Consolidated PBY Catalina sank the transport Nichiryu Maru. Although destroyers rescued 739 of the 1,100 troops on board, the ship took with it all of Okabe's medical supplies. Another transport, Myoko Maru, was so badly damaged at Lae by USAAF North American B-25 Mitchells that it had to be beached. Nonetheless, the convoy succeeded in reaching Lae on 7 January and landing its troops, but Okabe was defeated in the Battle of Wau.

Most of the 20th Division was landed at Wewak from naval high-speed transports on 19 January 1943. The bulk of the 41st Division followed on 12 February. Imamura and Vice Admiral Gunichi Mikawa, the commander of the South East Area Fleet, developed a plan to move the command post of the headquarters of the Japanese XVIII Army and the main body of the 51st Division from Rabaul to Lae on 3 March, followed by moving the remainder of the 20th Division to Madang on 10 March. This plan was acknowledged to be risky because Allied air power in the area was strong. The XVIII Army staff held war games that predicted losses of four out of ten transports, and between 30 and 40 aircraft. They gave the operation only a 50–50 chance of success. If the troops were landed at Madang, though, they faced a march of more than 140 mi (230 km) over inhospitable swamp, mountain, and jungle terrain without roads. To augment the three naval and two army fighter groups in the area assigned to protect the convoy, the Imperial Japanese Navy temporarily detached 18 fighters from the aircraft carrier Zuihō's fighter group from Truk to Kavieng.

=== Allied intelligence ===
The Allies soon began detecting signs of preparations for a new convoy. A Japanese floatplane of the type normally used for antisubmarine patrols in advance of convoys was sighted on 7 February 1943. The Allied Air Forces SWPA commander – Lieutenant General George Kenney – ordered an increase in reconnaissance patrols over Rabaul. On 14 February, aerial photographs were taken that showed 79 vessels in port, including 45 merchant ships and six transports. Clearly, another convoy was being prepared, but its destination was unknown. On 16 February, naval codebreakers in Melbourne (FRUMEL) and Washington, DC, finished decrypting and translating a coded message revealing the Japanese intention to land convoys at Wewak, Madang, and Lae. Subsequently, codebreakers decrypted a message from the Japanese 11th Air Fleet to the effect that destroyers and six transports would reach Lae about 5 March. Another report indicated that they would reach Lae by 12 March. On 22 February, reconnaissance aircraft reported 59 merchant vessels in the harbour at Rabaul.

Kenney read this Ultra intelligence in the office of the Supreme Allied Commander, SWPA – General Douglas MacArthur – on 25 February. The prospect of an additional 6,900 Japanese troops in the Lae area greatly disturbed MacArthur, as they might seriously affect his plans to capture and develop the area. Kenney wrote out orders, which were sent by courier, for Brigadier General Ennis Whitehead, the deputy commander of the Fifth Air Force, and the commander of its Advance Echelon (ADVON) in New Guinea. Under the Fifth Air Force's unusual command arrangements, Whitehead controlled the Allied Air Forces units of all types in New Guinea. This included the RAAF units there, which were grouped as No. 9 Operational Group RAAF, under the command of Air Commodore Joe Hewitt.

Kenney informed Whitehead of the proposed convoy date, and warned him about the usual Japanese preconvoy air attack. He also urged that flying hours be cut back, so as to allow for a large strike on the convoy, and instructed him to move forward as many aircraft as possible so that they could be close to the nearby captured airfields around Dobodura, where they would not be subject to the vagaries of weather over the Owen Stanley Range. Kenney flew up to Port Moresby on 26 February, where he met with Whitehead. The two generals inspected fighter and bomber units in the area and agreed to attack the Japanese convoy in the Vitiaz Strait. Kenney returned to Brisbane on 28 February.

== Allied tactics ==
In the SWPA, a conventional strategic bombing campaign was out of the question, as industrial targets in Japan were well beyond the range of even the largest strategic bombers operating from bases in Australia and New Guinea. Therefore, the primary mission of the Allied bomber force was interdiction of Japanese supply lines, especially the sea lanes. The results of the effort against the Japanese convoy in January were very disappointing; some 416 sorties had been flown with only two ships sunk and three damaged; clearly, a change of tactics was in order. Group Captain Bill Garing, an RAAF officer on Kenney's staff with considerable experience in air-sea operations, including a tour of duty in Europe, recommended that Japanese convoys be subjected to simultaneous attack from different altitudes and directions.

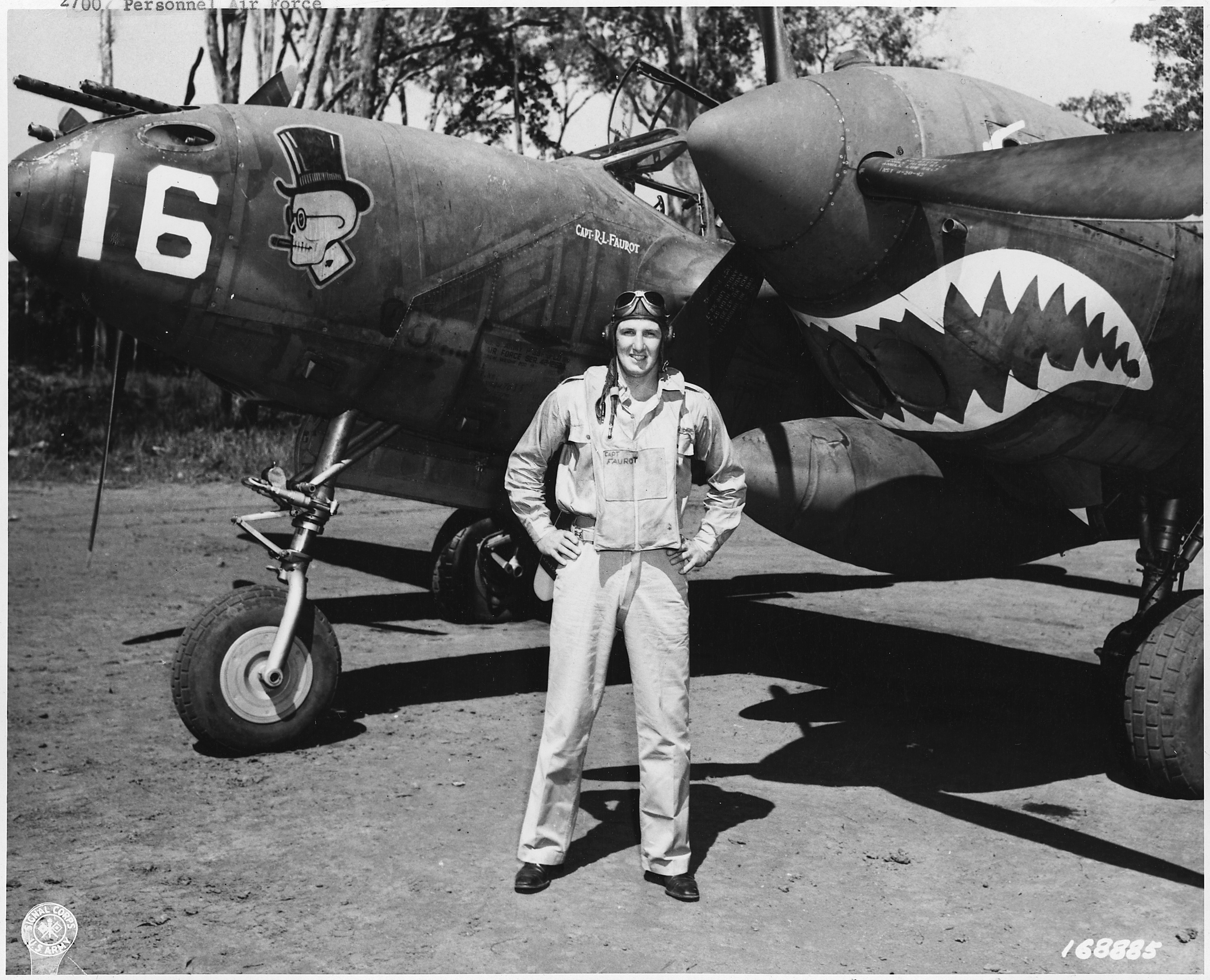
Captain Robert L. Faurot of the 39th Fighter Squadron, seen here in front of his P-38 Lightning: He was shot down by Japanese fighters during the Battle of the Bismarck Sea.

The Allied Air Forces adopted some innovative tactics. In February 1942, the RAAF began experimenting with skip bombing, an antishipping technique used by the British and Germans. Flying only a few dozen feet above the sea toward their targets, bombers would release their bombs, which would then, ideally, ricochet across the surface of the water and explode at the side of the target ship, under it, or just over it. A similar technique was mast-height bombing, in which bombers would approach the target at low altitude, 200 to 500 feet (61 to 152 m), at about 265 to 275 miles per hour (426 to 443 km/h), and then drop down to mast height, 10 to 15 feet (3.0 to 4.6 m) at about 600 yards (550 m) from the target. They would release their bombs around 300 yards (270 m) high, aiming directly at the side of the ship. The Battle of the Bismarck Sea would demonstrate that this was the more successful of the two tactics. The two techniques were not mutually exclusive; a bomber could drop two bombs, skipping the first and launching the second at mast height. In addition, as regular bomb fuses were designed to detonate immediately on impact, which would catch the attacking aircraft in its own bomb blast at low-altitude attacks, crews developed a delayed-action fuse. Practice missions were carried out against the wreck of the SS Pruth, a liner that had run aground in 1923.

For bombers to conduct skip or mast-height bombing, the target ship's antiaircraft artillery would first have to be neutralized by strafing runs. For the latter task, Major Paul I. "Pappy" Gunn and his men at the 81st Depot Repair Squadron in Townsville, Queensland, modified some USAAF Douglas A-20 Havoc light bombers by installing four .50-inch (12.7 mm) machine guns in their noses in September 1942. Two 450-US-gallon (1,700 L; 370 imp gal) fuel tanks were added, giving the aircraft more range. An attempt was then made in December 1942 to create a longer-range attack aircraft by doing the same thing to a B-25 medium bomber to convert it to a "commerce destroyer", but this proved to be somewhat more difficult. The resulting aircraft was nose-heavy despite added lead ballast in the tail, and the vibrations caused by firing the machine guns were enough to make rivets pop out of the skin of the aircraft. The tail guns and belly turrets were removed, the latter being of little use if the aircraft were flying low. The new tactic of having the B-25 strafe ships would be tried in this battle.

The Fifth Air Force had two heavy bomber groups. The 43rd Bombardment Group was equipped with about 55 Boeing B-17 Flying Fortresses. Most of these had seen hard war service over the previous six months, and their availability rate was low. The recently arrived 90th Bombardment Group was equipped with Consolidated B-24 Liberators, but they, too, had maintenance problems. Of the two medium groups, the 38th Bombardment Group was equipped with B-25 Mitchells, and the 22nd Bombardment Group was equipped with Martin B-26 Marauders, but two of the former's four squadrons had been diverted to the South Pacific Area, and the latter had taken so many losses that it had been withdrawn to Australia to be rebuilt.

Also, a light group, the 3rd Attack Group, was equipped with a mix of Douglas A-20 Havocs and B-25 Mitchells. This group not only was short of aircraft, but also was critically short of aircrew, as well. To make up the numbers, the USAAF turned to the RAAF for help. Australian aircrew were assigned to most of the group's aircraft, serving in every role except aircraft commander. In addition to the RAAF aircrew with the USAAF squadrons, RAAF units were in the Port Moresby area. No. 30 Squadron RAAF, which had arrived in Port Moresby in September 1942, was equipped with the Bristol Beaufighter. Both the aircraft and the squadron proved adept at low-level attacks. Also in the Port Moresby area, the 35th and 49th Fighter Groups were both equipped with Bell P-39, Curtiss P-40 Warhawk, and Lockheed P-38 Lightning fighters, but only the last were suitable for long-range escort missions.

== Battle ==
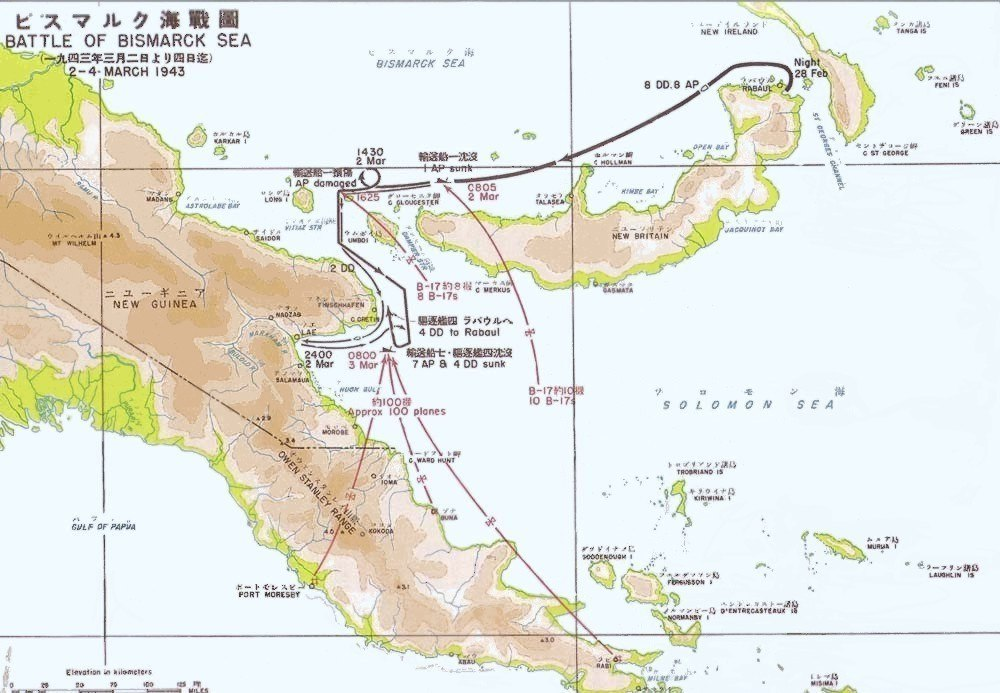
Japanese ship movements (black) and Allied air attacks (red) during the battle

=== Convoy departure from Rabaul ===
The Japanese convoy – comprising eight destroyers and eight troop transports with an escort of about 100 Mitsubishi A6M Zero fighters – assembled and departed from Simpson Harbour in Rabaul on 28 February. The A6Ms from the Japanese fighter base at Lae formed a combat air patrol over the convoy. The destroyers were fast and maneuverable, but with most of their weaponry focused on antisurface capabilities, their antiaircraft defenses were weak, as most only had two antiaircraft machine guns or cannons, while their 5-inch dual-purpose guns were not effective in an antiaircraft role.

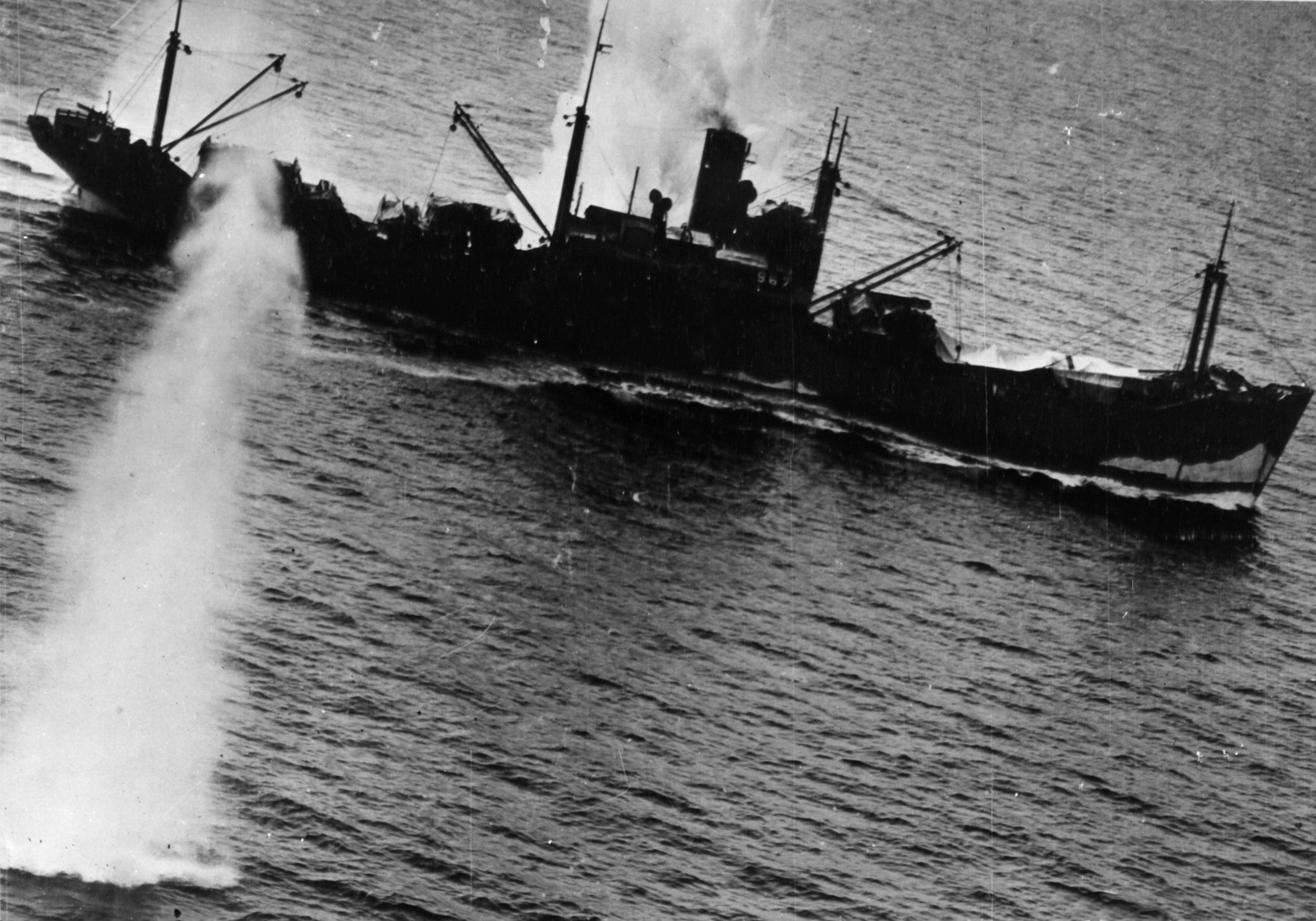
Fifth Air Force bombs bracket the transport Taimei Maru

The destroyers carried 958 troops, while the transports took 5,954. All the ships were combat loaded to expedite unloading at Lae. The commander of the Japanese XVIII Army, Lieutenant General Hatazō Adachi, travelled on the destroyer Tokitsukaze, while that of the 51st Division, Lieutenant General Hidemitsu Nakano, was on board the destroyer Yukikaze. The escort commander – Rear Admiral Masatomi Kimura of the 3rd Destroyer Flotilla – flew his flag from the destroyer Shirayuki. The other five destroyers were Arashio, Asashio, Asagumo, Shikinami and Uranami. They escorted seven Army transports: Aiyo Maru (2,716 gross register tons), Kembu Maru (950 tons), Kyokusei Maru (5,493 tons), Oigawa Maru (6,494 tons), Sin-ai Maru (3,793 tons), Taimei Maru (2,883 tons), and Teiyo Maru (6,870 tons). Rounding out the force was the lone Navy transport Nojima Maru (8,125 tons). All the ships carried troops, equipment, and ammunition, except for the Kembu Maru, which carried 1,000 drums of avgas and 650 drums of other fuel.

During the January operation, a course was followed that hugged the south coast of New Britain. This had made providing air cover easy, but being close to the airfields also made Allied air forces attacks on both the convoy and the airfields possible at the same time. This time, a route was chosen along the north coast, in the hope that the Allies would be deceived into thinking that the convoy's objective was Madang. Allied air attacks on the convoy at this point would have to fly over New Britain, allowing interdiction from Japanese air bases there, but the final leg of the voyage would be particularly dangerous, because the convoy would have to negotiate the restricted waters of Vitiaz Strait. The Japanese named the convoy "Operation 81."

=== First attacks ===
The convoy, moving at 7 kn (8.1 mph; 13 km/h), was not detected for some time, because of two tropical storms that struck the Solomon and Bismarck Seas between 27 February and 1 March, but around 15:00 on 1 March, the crew of a patrolling B-24 Liberator heavy bomber spotted the convoy. Eight B-17 Flying Fortresses were sent to the location, but failed to locate the ships.

At dawn on 2 March, a force of six RAAF A-20 Bostons attacked Lae to reduce its ability to provide support. Around 10:00, another Liberator found the convoy. Eight B-17s took off to attack the ships, followed an hour later by another 20. The B-17s were planned to rendezvous with P-38 fighters from the 9th Fighter Squadron, but the B-17s arrived early and faced the Japanese fighters on their own for the initial air battle until the P-38s arrived. They found the convoy and attacked with 1,000 lb (450 kg) bombs from 5,000 ft (1,500 m). They claimed to have sunk up to three merchant ships. Kyokusei Maru had sunk, carrying 1,200 army troops, and two other transports, Teiyo Maru and Nojima, were damaged. Eight Japanese fighters were destroyed and 13 damaged in the day's action, while nine B-17s were damaged.

The destroyers Yukikaze and Asagumo plucked 950 survivors of Kyokusei Maru from the water. These two destroyers, being faster than the convoy, since its speed was dictated by the slower transports, broke away from the group to disembark the survivors at Lae. The destroyers resumed their escort duties the next day. The convoy – without the troop transport and two destroyers – was attacked again on the evening of 2 March by 11 B-17s, with minor damage to one transport. During the night, PBY Catalina flying boats from No. 11 Squadron RAAF took over the shadowing the convoy.

=== Further attacks ===
By 3 March, the convoy was within range of the air base at Milne Bay, and eight Bristol Beaufort torpedo bombers from No. 100 Squadron RAAF took off from there. Because of bad weather, only two found the convoy, and neither scored any hits, but the weather cleared after they rounded the Huon Peninsula. A force of 90 Allied aircraft took off from Port Moresby and headed for Cape Ward Hunt, while 22 A-20 Bostons of No. 22 Squadron RAAF attacked the Japanese fighter base at Lae, reducing the convoy's air cover. Attacks on the base continued throughout the day.

At 10:00, 13 B-17s reached the convoy and bombed from a medium altitude of 7,000 feet, causing the ships to maneuver, which dispersed the convoy and reduced their concentrated antiaircraft firepower. The B-17s attracted Mitsubishi A6M Zero fighters, which were, in turn, attacked by the P-38 Lightning escorts. A B-17 broke up in the air, and its crew took to their parachutes. Japanese fighter pilots machine-gunned some of the B-17 crew members as they descended and attacked others in the water after they landed. Five of the Japanese fighters strafing the B-17 aircrew were promptly engaged and shot down by three P-38s, which were also lost. The Allied fighter pilots claimed 15 Zeros destroyed, while the B-17 crews claimed five more. Actual Japanese fighter losses for the day were seven destroyed and three damaged. B-25s arrived shortly afterward and released their 500-pound bombs between 3,000 and 6,000 feet, reportedly causing two Japanese vessels to collide. The result of the B-17 and B-25 sorties scored few hits, but left the convoy ships separated, making them vulnerable to strafers and masthead bombers, and with the Japanese antiaircraft fire being focused on the medium-altitude bombers left an opening for minimum-altitude attacks.

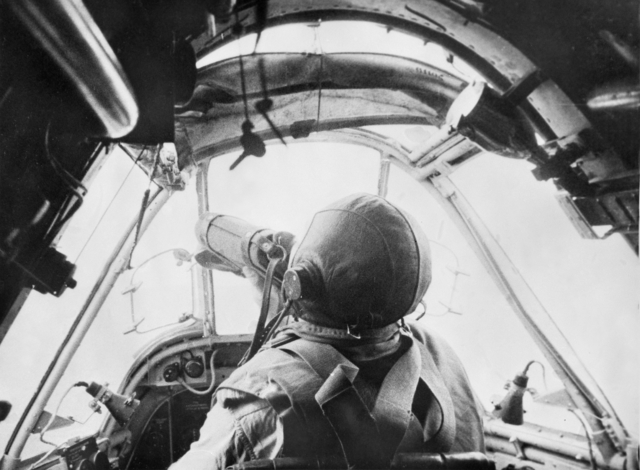
Pilot Flight Lieutenant Torchy Uren of No. 30 Squadron RAAF takes a drink from his water canteen while in the cockpit of his Beaufighter during the battle.

The 13 Beaufighters from No. 30 Squadron RAAF approached the convoy at low level to give the impression they were Beauforts making a torpedo attack. The ships turned to face them, the standard procedure to present a smaller target to torpedo bombers, allowing the Beaufighters to maximise the damage they inflicted on the ships' antiaircraft guns, bridges, and crews in strafing runs with their four 20 mm (0.79 in) nose cannons and six wing-mounted .303 in (7.70 mm) machine guns. On board one of the Beaufighters was cameraman Damien Parer, who shot dramatic footage of the battle; it was later included in the newsreel The Bismarck Convoy Smashed. Immediately afterward, seven B-25s of the 38th Bombardment Group's 71st Bombardment Squadron bombed from about 750 m (2,460 ft), while six from the 405th Bombardment Squadron attacked at mast height.

According to the official RAAF release on the Beaufighter attack, "enemy crews were slain beside their guns, deck cargo burst into flame, superstructures toppled and burned". Garrett Middlebrook, a co-pilot in one of the B-25s, described the ferocity of the strafing attacks:

They went in and hit this troop ship. What I saw looked like little sticks, maybe a foot long or something like that, or splinters flying up off the deck of ship; they'd fly all around;... and twist crazily in the air and fall out in the water. Then I realized what I was watching were human beings. I was watching hundreds of those Japanese just blown off the deck by those machine guns. They just splintered around the air like sticks in a whirlwind and they'd fall in the water.

Shirayuki was the first ship to be hit, by a combination of strafing and bombing attacks. Almost all the men on the bridge became casualties, including Kimura, who was wounded. One bomb hit started a magazine explosion that caused the stern to break off, and the ship to sink. Shirayuki was scuttled after her crew, including Kimura, was transferred to Shikinami. The destroyer Tokitsukaze was stricken after taking a bomb in her engine room, and her crew was taken off by Yukikaze. The destroyer Arashio was hit, and collided with the transport Nojima, disabling her. Both the destroyer and the transport were abandoned, and Nojima was later sunk by an air attack.

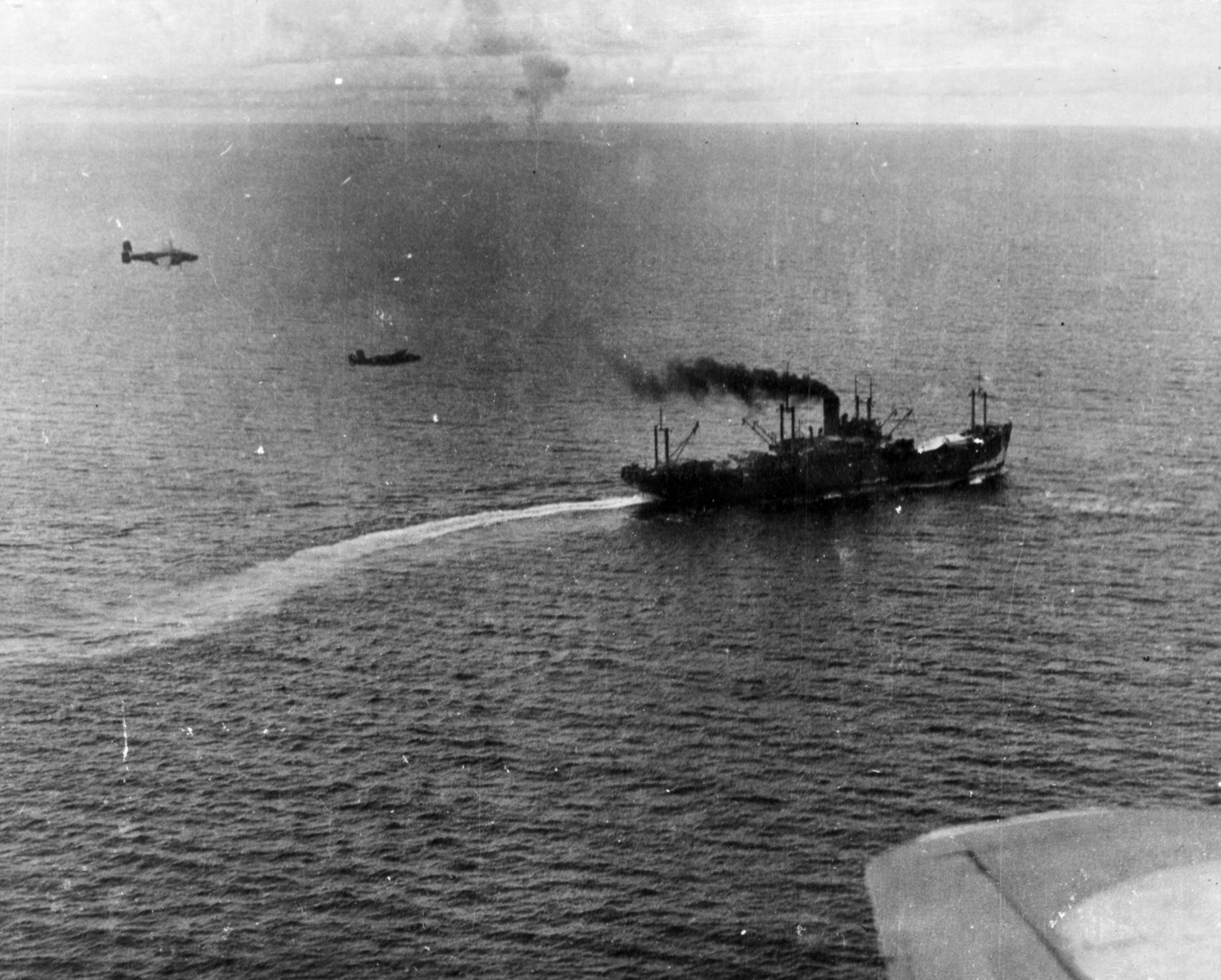
Allied aircraft execute a low-level attack on a Japanese ship

Fourteen B-25s returned that afternoon, reportedly claiming 17 hits or near misses. By this time, a third of the transports had been sunk or were sinking. As the Beaufighters and B-25s had expended their munitions, some USAAF A-20 Havocs of the 3rd Attack Group joined in. Another five hits were claimed by B-17s of the 43rd Bombardment Group from higher altitudes. During the afternoon, further attacks from USAAF B-25s and Bostons of No. 22 Squadron RAAF followed.

All seven of the transports were hit and most were burning or sinking about 100 km (54 nmi; 62 mi) southeast of Finschhafen, along with the destroyers Shirayuki, Tokitsukaze, and Arashio. Four of the destroyers – Shikinami, Yukikaze, Uranami, and Asagumo – picked up as many survivors as they could and then retired to Rabaul, accompanied by the destroyer Hatsuyuki, which had come from Rabaul to assist. That night, a force of 10 U.S. Navy PT boats, under the command of Lieutenant Commander Barry Atkins, set out to attack the convoy. Two boats struck submerged debris and were forced to return. The other eight arrived off Lae in the early hours of 4 March. Atkins spotted a fire that turned out to be the transport Oigawa Maru. PT-143 and PT-150 fired torpedoes at it, sinking the crippled vessel. In the morning, a fourth destroyer – Asashio – was sunk when a B-17 hit her with a 500 lb (230 kg) bomb while she was picking up survivors from Arashio. Only one destroyer, Yukikaze, was undamaged among the four surviving destroyers.

=== Rescue & strafing of shipwrecked survivors ===
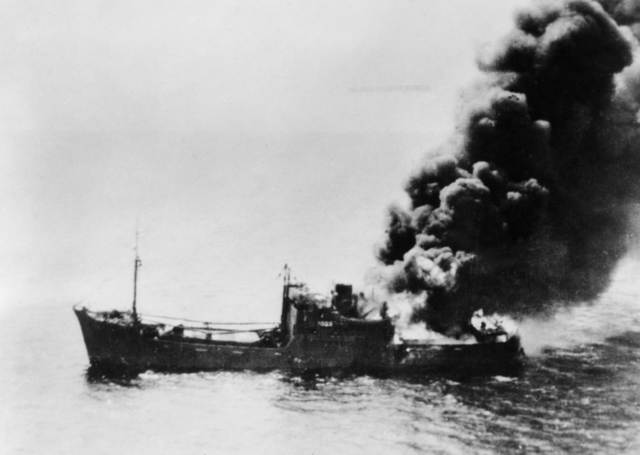
A Japanese ship, Kenbu Maru, under attack

Some 2,700 survivors were taken to Rabaul by the destroyers. On 4 March, another 1,000 or so survivors were adrift on rafts. On the evenings of 3–5 March, PT boats and planes attacked Japanese rescue vessels, as well as the survivors from the sunken vessels on life rafts and swimming or floating in the sea. This was later justified on the grounds that rescued servicemen would have been rapidly landed at their military destination and promptly returned to active service, as well as being retaliation for the Japanese fighter planes attacking survivors of the downed B-17 bomber. That some Japanese fighters had strafed parachuting airmen from the B-17 piloted by Lt. Woodrow W. Moore of the 43 Bombardment Group (heavy) had incensed allied airmen, and news of the incident spread quickly in Port Moresby upon the return of bombers from the initial bombing runs, prompting many bombers to return to the convoy for the express purpose of strafing and bombing shipwrecked survivors. While many of the Allied aircrew accepted these attacks as being necessary, others were sickened. On 6 March, the Japanese submarines I-17 and I-26 picked up 170 survivors. Two days later, I-26 found another 54 and put them ashore at Lae. Hundreds made their way to various islands. One band of 18 survivors landed on Kiriwina, where they were captured by PT-114. Another made its way to Guadalcanal, only to be killed by an American patrol.

On 4 March, the Japanese mounted a retaliatory raid on the Buna airfield, the site of a base that the Allies had captured back in January, though the fighters did little damage. Kenney wrote in his memoir that the Japanese reprisal occurred "after the horse had been stolen from the barn. It was a good thing that the Nip air commander was stupid. Those hundred airplanes would have made our job awfully hard if they had taken part in the big fight over the convoy on March 3rd."

On Goodenough Island between 8 and 14 March 1943, Australian patrols from the 47th Infantry Battalion found and killed 72 Japanese, captured 42, and found another nine dead on a raft. One patrol killed eight Japanese who had landed in two flat-bottomed boats, in which were found some documents in sealed tins. On translation by the Allied Translator and Interpreter Section, one document turned out to be a copy of the Japanese Army List, with the names and postings of every officer in the Japanese Army. It therefore provided a complete order of battle of the Japanese Army, including many units that had never before been reported. A mention of any Japanese officer could now be correlated with his unit. Copies were made available to intelligence units in every theatre of war against Japan.

== Aftermath ==
The battle was a disaster for the Japanese. Of 6,900 troops who were badly needed in New Guinea, only about 1,200 made it to Lae. Another 2,700 were saved by destroyers and submarines and returned to Rabaul. About 2,890 Japanese soldiers and sailors were killed. The Allies lost 13 aircrew, 10 of whom were lost in combat, while three others died in an accident, with also eight wounded. Aircraft losses were one B-17 and three P-38s in combat, and one B-25 and one Beaufighter in accidents. MacArthur issued a communiqué on 7 March stating that 22 ships, including 12 transports, three cruisers, and seven destroyers, had been sunk along with 12,792 troops, based on a report by SWPA which also boasted exorbitant claims that included 60 enemy aircraft shot down, six destroyers or light cruisers sunk, and 11-14 merchantmen sunk. Army Air Force Headquarters in Washington, DC, looked into the matter in mid-1943 and concluded that only 16 ships were involved, but GHQ SWPA considered the original account accurate. The victory was a propaganda boon for the Allies, with one United States newsreel claiming the Japanese had lost 22 ships, 15,000 troops, and 102 aircraft. The New York Times, on its front page on March 4, 1943, cited the loss by the Japanese of 22 ships, 15,000 troops, and 55 aircraft, though the Japanese lost only 15 aircraft over the course of the raids.

The Allied Air Forces had used 233,847 rounds of ammunition and dropped 261 500-pound and 253 1,000-pound bombs. They claimed 19 hits and 42 near misses with the former and 59 hits and 39 near misses from the latter. Of the 137 bombs dropped in low-level attacks, 48 (35%) were claimed to have hit but only 29 (7.5%) of the 387 bombs dropped from medium altitude. This compared favourably with efforts in August and September 1942, when only 3% of bombs dropped were claimed to have scored hits. Of note, the high- and medium-altitude attacks scored few hits, but dispersed the convoy, while the strafing runs from the Beaufighters had knocked out many of the ships' antiaircraft defences. Aircraft attacking from several directions at once had confused and overwhelmed the Japanese defences, resulting in lower casualties and more accurate bombing. The results, therefore, vindicated not just the tactics of mast height attack, but also of mounting coordinated attacks from several directions. The Japanese estimated that at least 29 bombs had hit a ship during the battle. This was a big improvement over the Battle of Wau back in January, when Allied aircraft attacked a Japanese convoy consisting of five destroyers and five troop transports travelling from Rabaul to Lae, but managed to sink just one transport and beach another.

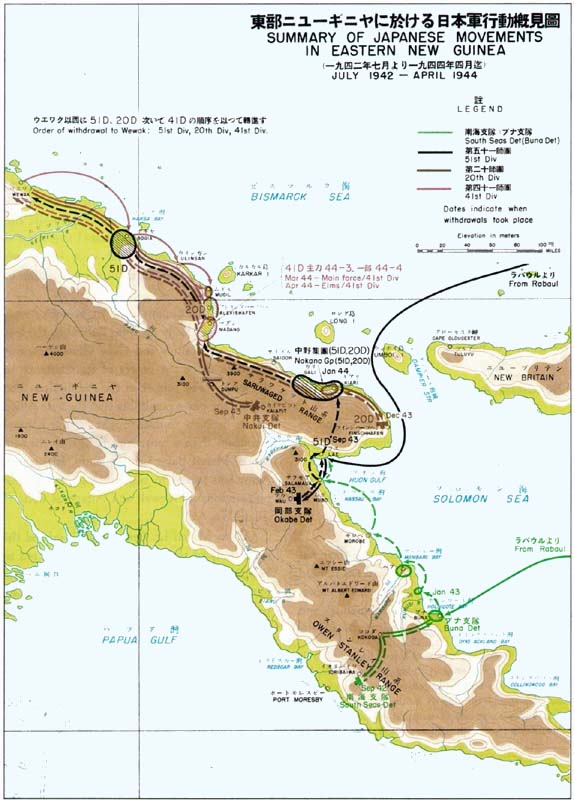
Summary of Japanese movements in eastern New Guinea, 1942–1944

Imamura's chief of staff flew to Imperial General Headquarters to report on the disaster. They decided that no more attempts would be made to land troops at Lae. The losses incurred in the Bismarck Sea caused grave concern for the security of Lae and Rabaul and resulted in a change of strategy. On 25 March, a joint Army-Navy Central Agreement on South West Area Operations gave operations in New Guinea priority over those in the Solomon Islands campaign. The XVIII Army was allocated additional shipping, ordnance, and antiaircraft units, which were sent to Wewak or Hansa Bay. Of the defeat, Rabaul staff officer Masatake Okumiya said, "Our losses for this single battle were fantastic. Not during the entire savage fighting at Guadalcanal did we suffer a single comparable blow. We knew we could no longer run cargo ships or even fast destroyer transports to any front on the north coast of New Guinea, east of Wewak".

The planned movement of the 20th Division to Madang was revised in the light of events in the Bismarck Sea. The operation was postponed for two days, and the destination was altered from Madang to Hansa Bay further west. To reduce the Allied air threat, the Allied airfield at Wau was bombed on 9 March and the one at Dobodura on 11 March. Three Allied aircraft were destroyed on the ground and one P-40 was lost in the air, but Allied fighters claimed nine Japanese aircraft. The transports reached Hansa Bay unscathed on 12 March and the troops made their way down to Madang on foot or in barges. The 20th Division then became involved in an attempt to construct a road from Madang to Lae through the Ramu and Markham Valleys. It toiled on the road for the next few months, but its efforts were ultimately frustrated by the New Guinea weather and the rugged terrain of the Finisterre Range.

Some submarines were made available for supply runs to Lae, but they did not have the capacity to support the troops there by themselves. An operation was carried out on 29 March in which four destroyers delivered 800 troops to Finschhafen, but the growing threat from Allied aircraft led to the development of routes along the coast of New Guinea from Madang to Finschhafen and along the north and south coasts of New Britain to Finschhafen, thence to Lae using Army landing craft. By these means, the remainder of the 51st Division finally made the trip to Lae in May. The necessity of delivering troops and supplies to the front in this manner caused immense difficulties for the Japanese in their attempts to halt further Allied advances. After the war, Japanese officers at Rabaul estimated that around 20,000 troops were lost in transit to New Guinea from Rabaul, a significant factor in Japan's ultimate defeat in the New Guinea campaign.

In April, Admiral Isoroku Yamamoto used the additional air resources allocated to Rabaul in Operation I-Go, an air offensive designed to redress the situation by destroying Allied ships and aircraft in New Guinea and the Solomon Islands. The operation was indecisive and Yamamoto became a casualty of Allied intelligence and air power in the Solomon Islands on 18 April 1943.

== Game theory ==
In 1954, O. G. Haywood, Jr., wrote an article in the Journal of the Operations Research Society of America in which game theory was used to model the decision-making in the battle. Since then, the name of the battle has been applied to this particular type of two-person zero-sum game.

As a very brief summary, the scenario modeled revolves around the decision Lt. General Kenney had to make just prior to the real-life battle. The Japanese commander had to choose one of two courses of action: Either sail his convoy north of the New Britain island, or south of it. General Kenney likewise had to choose: Focus any reconnaissance efforts north of the island, or south of it. This means four outcomes are possible, and game theory explains Gen. Kenney's real-life decision to concentrate his reconnaissance airplanes north of New Britain.
