= Aiyo Maru =

Japanese cargo ship

History

Japan
- Name: Aiyo Maru
- Builder: Nippon Kokan K.K, Tsurumi, Yokohama
- Laid down: 10 March 1941
- Launched: 28 October 1941
- Completed: 20 January 1942
- Fate: Sunk on 3 March 1943

General characteristics
- Type: Cargo ship
- Tonnage: 2,746 GRT; 4,331 DWT
- Installed power: 1,600 hp (1,200 kW)
- Speed: 15.31 knots (28.35 km/h; 17.62 mph)

Aiyo Maru was a 2,746-ton Type 1C Standard cargo ship/transport ship launched in 1941 and was requisitioned from its owners on 24 December 1942 by the Imperial Japanese Army during World War II. The ship was sunk by aircraft of the United States Army Air Forces and Royal Australian Air Force during the Battle of the Bismarck Sea on 3 March 1943.

== Service history ==
Aiyo Maru was ordered by Oyo Kisen K.K. from Nippon Kokan K.K. and built at their shipyard in Tsurumi, Yokohama in 1941. The ship was launched the same year. The ship was requisitioned by the Imperial Japanese Army during World War II on 24 December 1942. Other than being in a convoy 16–17 May 1942 From Tokyo Bay to Yokosuka, and another convoy, West Convoy No. 61, that departed Tokyo Bay 8 December 1942 bound for the Inland Sea, its record of movement were unknown until "Operation 81" began.

She left Rabaul, New Britain on 1 March 1943, as part of Operation 81, carrying troops, a cargo of equipment, fuel, 5 Daihatsu landing craft and ammunition for Lae, New Guinea. The convoy was attacked by aircraft of the United States Army Air Forces and Royal Australian Air Force from 2 March 1943, known as the Battle of the Bismarck Sea. Aiyo Maru was bombed on 3 March and sank at 07°15′S 148°30′E. 45 crewmen and 278 soldiers were killed.
