= Teiyo Maru (1924) =

History

Japan
- Name: Saarland
- Owner: Hamburg America Line
- Operator: Hamburg America Line
- Builder: Blohm + Voss, Hamburg
- Yard number: 460
- Laid down: 1923
- Launched: 20 October 1923
- Completed: delivered 2 February 1924
- Maiden voyage: 23 February 1924
- Renamed: Teiyo Maru
- Fate: Sunk by aircraft on 3 March 1943 in the Battle of the Bismarck Sea

General characteristics
- Type: Passenger ship
- Tonnage: 6,870 GRT
- Length: 136.9 metres (449 ft)
- Beam: 17.8 metres (58 ft)
- Draught: 8.2 metres (27 ft)
- Propulsion: 4 steam turbines
- Speed: 12 knots

SS Saarland was a 6,870 ton German passenger ship, which was sold to Japan in 1940, renamed Teiyo Maru and used as troop transport ship by the Imperial Japanese Army (IJA) during World War II. It sank during the Battle of the Bismarck Sea with great loss of life.

== Construction and sale ==
Saarland was built by Blohm + Voss in Hamburg and launched in 1924. It sailed for the Hamburg America Line until 1940, when it was sold to the Japanese Imperial Steamship Co. (Teikoku Senpaku Kaisha) and renamed Teiyo Maru. One year later it was requisitioned by the Imperial Japanese Army and used as a troopship.

== War service ==
In March 1943, she left Rabaul, New Britain, as part of Operation 81, carrying 1,988 troops of the IJA's 51st Division, including the 18th Army Headquarters and 1,500 cubic meters of war supplies. The convoy was attacked by aircraft of the United States Army Air Forces and Royal Australian Air Force from 2 March 1943, known as the Battle of the Bismarck Sea. On 3 March Teiyo Maru sustains 11 near misses, four direct bomb hits and two torpedoes. At about 1730, she bursts into flames and sinks at 06°56′S 148°16′E.
1,882 troops, 15 shipboard gunners, 17 crewmen and Captain Ishisaka Takezo are killed.
