= Japanese destroyer Tokitsukaze (1939) =

Kagerō-class destroyer

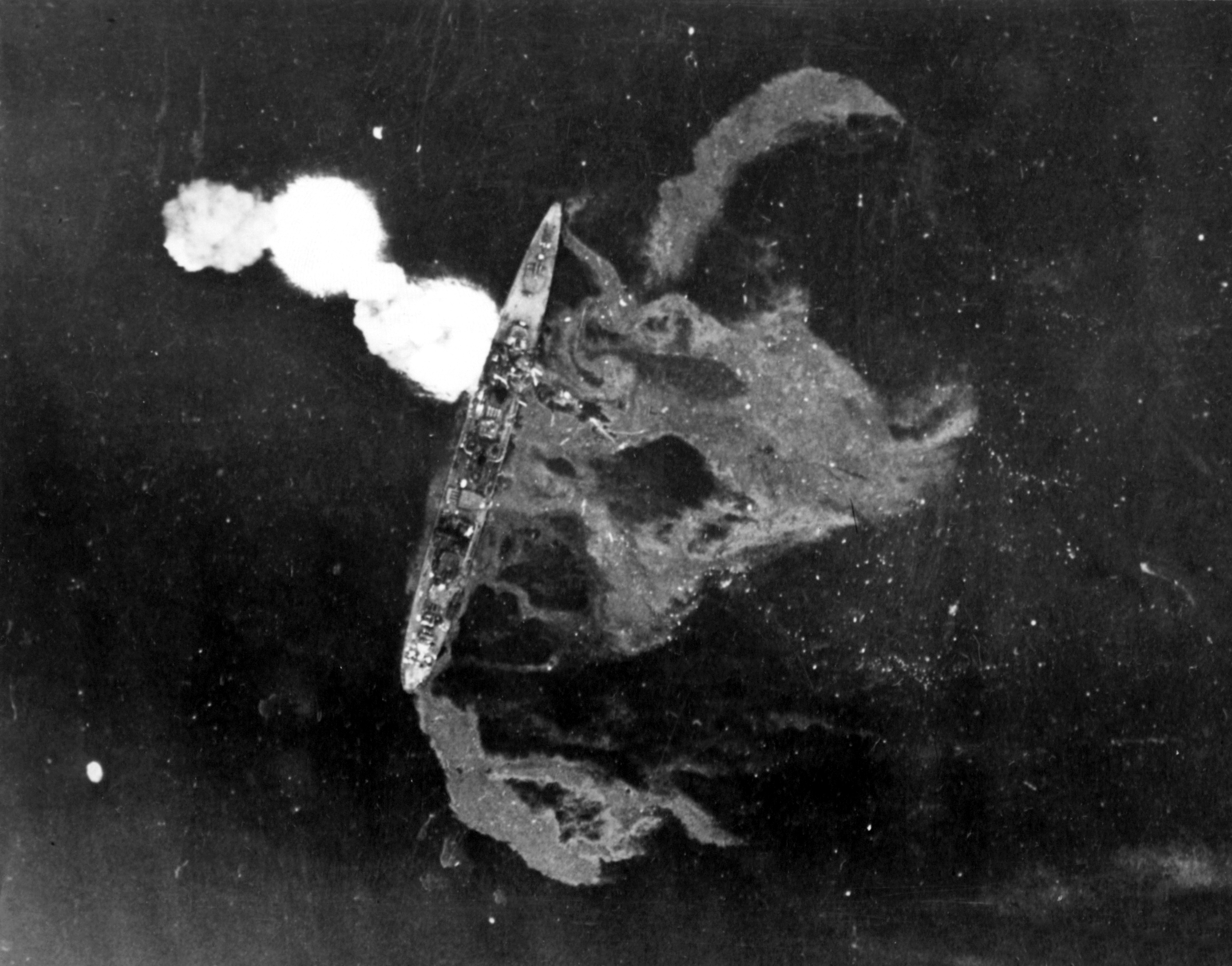
- Tokitsukaze stopped dead in the water by air attacks during the Battle of the Bismarck Sea, 4 March 1943.

History

Empire of Japan
- Name: Tokitsukaze
- Builder: Uraga Dock Company
- Laid down: 20 February 1939
- Launched: 10 November 1939
- Completed: 15 December 1940
- Stricken: 1 April 1943
- Fate: Sunk in action, 4 March 1943

General characteristics
- Class & type: Kagerō-class destroyer
- Displacement: 2,033 long tons (2,066 t) standard
- Length: 118.5 m (388 ft 9 in)
- Beam: 10.8 m (35 ft 5 in)
- Draft: 3.8 m (12 ft 6 in)
- Propulsion: 3 × Kampon water tube boilers; 2 × Kanpon impulse turbines; 2 × shafts, 52,000 shp (39 MW)
- Speed: 35.5 knots (40.9 mph; 65.7 km/h)
- Range: 5,000 NM at 18 knots (21 mph; 33 km/h)
- Complement: 239
- Armament: (1939); 6 × 12.7 cm/50 Type 3 DP guns; 2 × Type 96 25 mm AA guns; 8 × 610 mm (24 in) torpedo tubes; 18 depth charges; 2 × paravanes; (1943); 6 × 12.7 cm/50 Type 3 DP guns; 8 × Type 96 25 mm AA guns; 8 × 610 mm (24 in) torpedo tubes; 18 depth charges

Tokitsukaze (時津風, lit. "favorable wind") was the tenth vessel to be commissioned in the 19-vessel Kagerō-class destroyers built for the Imperial Japanese Navy in the late-1930s under the Circle Three Supplementary Naval Expansion Program (Maru San Keikaku). During WW2, Tokitsukaze took part in many transport and escorting missions while providing AA defense for aircraft carriers during the battles of the Eastern Solomons and Santa Cruz. In February 1942, Tokitsukaze served through the battle of the Java Sea without accomplishment but in the battle's aftermath helped to cripple the submarine USS S-37. Later in January 1943, Tokitsukaze helped to sink the patrol torpedo boats PT-43 and PT-112. Tokitsukaze was sunk by American and Australian air-force bombers during the battle of the Bismarck Sea from 3-4 March 1943.

== Background ==
The Kagerō-class destroyers were outwardly almost identical to the preceding Asashio class, with improvements made by Japanese naval architects to improve stability and to take advantage of Japan's lead in torpedo technology. They were designed to accompany the Japanese main striking force and in both day and night attacks against the United States Navy as it advanced across the Pacific Ocean, according to Japanese naval strategic projections. Despite being one of the most powerful classes of destroyers in the world at the time of their completion, only one survived the Pacific War.

Their crew numbered 240 officers and enlisted men. The ships measured 118.5 meters (388 ft 9 in) overall, with a beam of 10.8 meters (35 ft 5 in) and a draft of 3.76 meters (12 ft 4 in). They displaced 2,065 metric tons (2,032 long tons) at standard load and 2,529 metric tons (2,489 long tons) at deep load. The ships had two Kampon geared steam turbines, each driving one propeller shaft, using steam provided by three Kampon water-tube boilers. The turbines were rated at a total of 52,000 shaft horsepower (39,000 kW) for a designed speed of 35 knots (65 km/h; 40 mph). The ships had a range of 5,000 nautical miles (9,300 km; 5,800 mi) at a speed of 18 knots (33 km/h; 21 mph).

The main armament of the Kagerō class consisted of six Type 3 127-millimeter (5.0 in) guns in three twin-gun turrets, one superfiring pair aft and one turret forward of the superstructure. They were built with four Type 96 25-millimeter (1.0 in) anti-aircraft guns in two twin-gun mounts, but more of these guns were added over the course of the war. The ships were also armed with eight 610-millimeter (24.0 in) torpedo tubes for the oxygen-fueled Type 93 "Long Lance" torpedo in two quadruple traversing mounts; one reload was carried for each tube. Their anti-submarine weapons comprised 16 depth charges.

== Construction and career ==
Tokitsukaze was laid down on 20 February 1939 at the Uraga Dock Company. The ship was launched on 10 November 1939 and commissioned on 15 December 1940.

At the time of the attack on Pearl Harbor, 7 December 1941, Tokitsukaze, was assigned to Destroyer Division 16 (Yukikaze, Tokisukaze, Amatsukaze, Hatsukaze), and a member of Destroyer Squadron 2 of the IJN 2nd Fleet, and had deployed from Palau, as part of the escort for the aircraft carrier Ryūjō in the invasion of the southern Philippines.

In early 1942, Tokitsukaze participated in the invasion of the Netherlands East Indies, escorting the invasion forces for Menado, Kendari and Ambon in January, and the invasion forces for Timor and eastern Java in February.

On 26 February, Tokitsukaze was escorting a troop convoy to the Dutch East Indies when a Japanese floatplane intercepted an allied fleet of 2 heavy cruisers, 3 light cruisers, and 9 destroyers. Tokitsukaze sailed with the fleet to intercept the enemy ships, which would culminate in the battle of the Java Sea the following day. Enroute, a flight of B-17s attacked the Japanese warships and Tokitsukaze drove off two of the bombers with her AA fire. The two forces made contact in the afternoon of the 27th. Toktisukaze served in a line of 8 destroyers led by the light cruiser Jintsū as they closed to 6,000 yards for a torpedo attack and exchanged gunfire with the Dutch light cruiser De Ruyter. In turn, Tokitsukaze became the focus of the destroyer HMS Electra which hit her with a 4.7-inch (12 cm) shell to her forward funnel and caused thick white smoke to burst out of the ship, blinding Amatsukaze behind her. However, any damage was quickly patched up as Tokitsukaze contributed 8 torpedoes to a spread of 70 aimed at the enemy ships. Despite this, not a single torpedo made its mark as the destroyer column retreated to enemy lines without accomplishment. The next day, Tokitsukaze was still on patrol when Yukikaze located the submarine USS S-37. Tokitsukaze joined Yukikaze in attacking the submarine and together dropped 10 depth charges, destroying her starboard engine, breaking her coolers, and causing major flooding and an oil leak, forcing S-37 to retreat to Australia for immense repairs. On 2 March, Tokitsukaze and Yukikaze encountered another submarine and dropped 10 depth charges to unknown effect. At the end of the month, Tokitsukaze deployed from Ambon for the invasion of Western New Guinea. At the end of April, she returned to Kure Naval Arsenal for repairs, docking on 2 May.

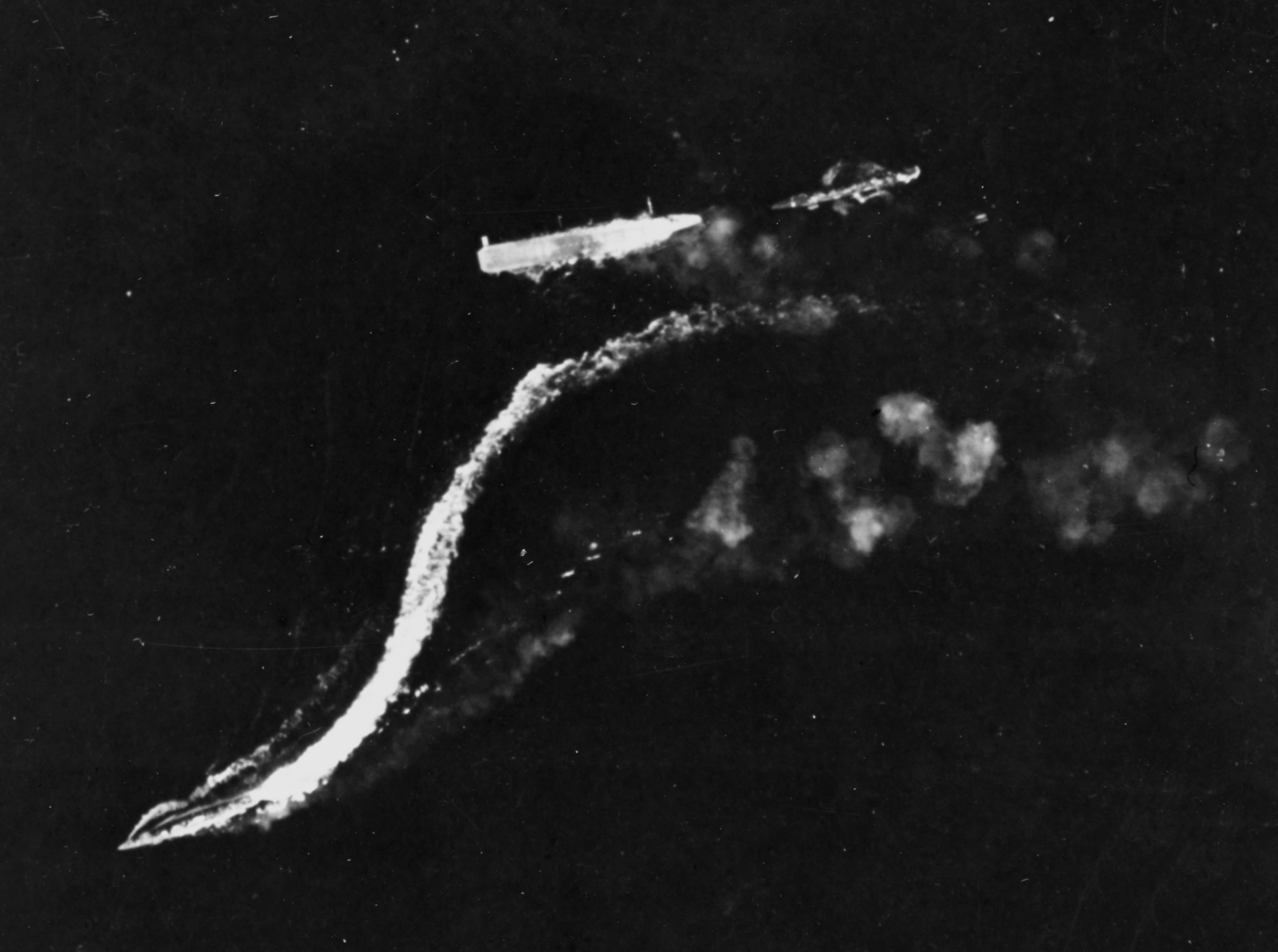
Tokitsukaze (top right) assisting the light carrier Ryūjō during the battle of the Eastern Solomons, 24 August 1942

On 21 May 1942, Tokitsukaze and Desron 2 steamed from Kure to Saipan, where they rendezvoused with a troop convoy and sailed toward Midway Island. Due to the defeat of the Carrier Striking Force and loss of four fleet carriers in the Battle of Midway, the invasion was called off and the convoy withdrew without seeing combat. Desdiv 16 was ordered back to Kure. On 14 July, Tokitsukaze was reassigned to the IJN 3rd Fleet and was assigned to escort the transport Nankai Maru to Rabaul, returning with the cruiser Mogami to Kure in mid-August. Tokitsukaze returned to the Solomon Islands before the end of the month, in time to participate in the Battle of the Eastern Solomons on 24 August, as an escort to Ryūjō and the cruiser Tone. After the battle, she assisted in the rescue of the survivors from Ryūjō and spent the month of September on patrols based out of Truk. She escorted the damaged carrier Taiyō to Kure for repairs in mid-October.

During the Battle of Santa Cruz Islands on 26 October, she was part of Admiral Nagumo's Strike Force. In early November, she returned to Kure with Zuikaku, and participated in training exercises in the Inland Sea through the end of the year.

On 10 January, Tokitsukaze departed the Shortlands as part of a flotilla of 8 destroyers for a supply-drum transport run to Guadalcanal, but starting at 20:00 the group was attacked by squadrons of American torpedo boats. For nearly 3 hours, Kawakaze, Kuroshio, Tokitsukaze, and Hatsukaze fought off the PT-Boats, but at 22:47 Hatsukaze was charged by PT-43 and PT-112 and a torpedo from the latter smashed into her bow, badly damaging the destroyer. Tokitsukaze came to assist the wounded Hatsukaze as the duo turned their guns on the attackers and took revenge. Their second salvo struck PT-43 and disabled her before their 25 mm AA-guns ravaged the torpedo boat, killing 3 men before the abandon ship order was issued. Tokitsukaze and Hatsukaze then turned their guns on PT-112 which they hit with two 5-inch (127 mm) shells below the waterline in the forward bulkhead of the engine room. PT-112 foundered until 1:30 when she violently exploded and rapidly sank while the drifting PT-43 later grounded on the Chapuru shore; her wreck was demolished 2 days later. Joined by other destroyers, Tokitsukaze escorted Hatsukaze back to the shortlands where she refused before departing as part of another supply mission on the 14th, where she was harassed by PT-boats and land based aircraft but remained undamaged and completed the mission before returning to the Shortlands by the next morning.

Tokitsukaze embarked on a troop transport run on 24 January, and after returning to the Shortlands was attacked by enemy aircraft but not damaged. Tokitsukaze then led a troop transport run to the Russel Islands on the 28th where the group of first attacked by aircraft at 13:30 then bombed again at 23:45, during which she was not damaged and fired 22 5-inch (127 mm) shells and 72 machine gun rounds, returning to port the next day. From 1-7 February, Tokitsukaze participated in all three evacuations of Guadalcanal, being attacked by waves of aircraft several times but sustaining no damage, before she escorted the transport ship Goshu Maru from Rabaul to New Britain and back from 18-21 February.

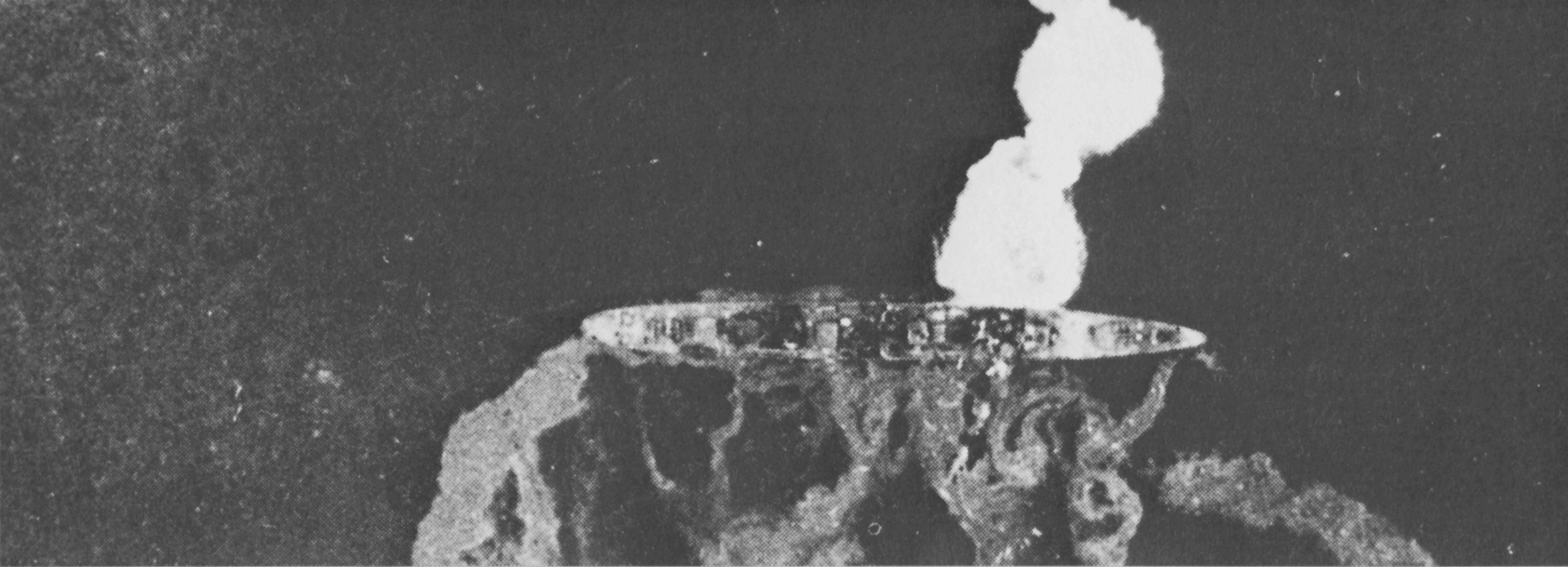
This destroyer on 4 March 1943 is often credited as Asashio, but she had sunk the previous day. The positioning of the torpedo tubes and placement of the torpedo reloads give its identity away as Tokitsukaze

During the Battle of Bismarck Sea on 3 March 1943, Tokitsukaze was damaged by an Allied air attack, which killed 19 crewmen and left her dead in the water. Her skipper, Cdr Masayoshi Motokura, gave the order to abandon ship, and the survivors were taken aboard the destroyer Yukikaze. The abandoned vessel was discovered southeast of Finschhafen and sunk by Allied aircraft the following morning at coordinates (07°16′S 148°15′E).

She was removed from the navy list on 1 April 1943.

== See also ==
- List of ships of the Imperial Japanese Navy

== Books ==
- Brown, David (1990). Warship Losses of World War Two. Naval Institute Press. ISBN 1-55750-914-X.
- D'Albas, Andrieu (1965). Death of a Navy: Japanese Naval Action in World War II. Devin-Adair Pub. ISBN 0-8159-5302-X.
- Evans, David (1979). Kaigun: Strategy, Tactics, and Technology in the Imperial Japanese Navy, 1887–1941. US Naval Institute Press. ISBN 0-87021-192-7.
- Roger Chesneau, ed. (1980). Conway's All the World's Fighting Ships 1922–1946. Grenwitch: Conway Maritime Press. ISBN 0-85177-146-7.
- Howarth, Stephen (1983). The Fighting Ships of the Rising Sun: The Drama of the Imperial Japanese Navy, 1895–1945. Atheneum. ISBN 0-689-11402-8.
- Jentsura, Hansgeorg (1976). Warships of the Imperial Japanese Navy, 1869–1945. US Naval Institute Press. ISBN 0-87021-893-X.
- Watts, A.J. (1966). Japanese warships of World War II. Ian Allan. ISBN 0711002150.
- Whitley, M. J. (1988). Destroyers of World War 2. Cassell Publishing. ISBN 1-85409-521-8.
