= List of PT boat bases =

This is a list of PT boat bases used by the US Navy during World War II.

== United States ==
- Melville, Rhode Island – PT Training Center
- New York, New York – Commissioning Detail
- New Orleans, Louisiana – Commissioning Detail
- Miami, Florida – Operational Shakedown
- New Orleans, Louisiana – Ferrying Command
- Seattle, Washington – Ferrying Command
- ST Augustine, FL – Base of some sort where Conch House is now.
- Thursday Island PT Boat Base, Panama Canal Zone

== Rear Pacific Area ==
- Pearl Harbor PT Boat Base, Hawaii – Main Naval base
- Tutuila, Samoa – Base 7
- Palmyra Island – Advanced Base
- Funafuti, Ellice Islands – Advanced base
- Naval Base Noumea, Nouméa, New Caledonia – Staging base
- Taboga, Panama – Training Base

== Philippines ==
- Cavite, Luzon – Main Base
- Liloan, Panaon Island – Advanced Base
- San Pedro bay, Leyte – Advanced Base 5
- Mangarin Bay, Mindoro – Advance Base
- Ormoc, Leyte – Advanced Base
- Lingayen Gulf – Advanced Base 6
- Bobon Point, Samar – Base 17
- Subic Bay – Advanced Base
- Palawan – Advanced Base
- Zamboanga, Mindanao – Advanced Base
- Basilan – Base 16
- Iloilo City, Panay – Advanced Base
- Malamaui Island – Advanced Base
- Polloc Harbor – Advanced Base
- Sarangani Bay – Advanced Base
- Malalag Bay – Advanced Base
- Santiago Cove – Fueling Stop

== Solomon Islands ==
- Espiritu Santo Naval Base, New Hebrides – Bases 1,2,3,15
- Tulagi – Bases 1,2,8
- Rendova – Base 11
- Lever Harbor, New Georgia – Advanced Base
- Vella Lavella – Advanced Base
- Treasury Island – Base 9
- Cape Torokina, Bougainville – Base 9
- Green Island – Base 7
- Homestead Lagoon, Emirau – Base 16

== Aleutian Islands ==
- Dutch Harbor – Base 5
- Finger Bay, Adak – Base 5
- Amchitka – Advanced Base 5
- Casco Cove, Attu – Base 13

== Australia, Papua New Guinea & Dutch New Guinea ==
- Cairns, Australia – Base 4
- Kana Kopa, Milne Bay – Base 4, 6
- Ladava, Milne Bay – Base 4
- Tufi – Advanced Base
- Morobe River – Advanced Base
- Thursday Island – Base 10
- Darwin, Australia – Base 10
- Naval Base Woodlark Island, Woodlark Island – Advanced Base
- Fergusson Island – Advanced Base
- Buna Roads – Advanced Base
- Kiriwina Island – Advanced Base
- Dreger Harbor – Advanced Base
- Saidor – Advanced Base
- Seeadler Harbor – Advanced Base
- Rein Bay, New Britain – Advanced Base
- Talasea, New Britain – Advanced Base
- Aitape – Advanced base
- Hollandia – Advanced Base
- Mios Woendi – Base 21
- Wakde – Advanced Base
- Amsterdam Island – Advanced base 3
- LST-201 – Base 14
- Morotai – Advanced Base 4

== Borneo ==
- Tarakan – Advanced Base
- Tawai Tawi – Advanced Base
- Brunel Bay – Advanced Base
- Balikpapan – Advanced Base

== Japan ==
- Teguchi Harbor – Base 24, 25

== Mediterranean ==
- Bone, Algeria – Advanced Base
- Bizerte, Tunisia – Base 12
- Palermo, Sicily – Advanced Base
- Capri, Italy – Advanced Base
- Maddalena, Sardinia – Advanced Base
- Bastia, Corsica – Advanced Base
- Calvi, Corsica – Advanced Base
- St. Maxime, France – Advanced Base
- Gulf Juan, France – Advanced Base
- Leghorn, Italy – Advanced Base

== Atlantic ==
- Dartmouth, England – Advanced Base
- Portland, England – Main Base
- Cherbourg, France – Advanced Base
- Roseneath, Scotland – Transfer Point
