= Taimei Maru (1936) =

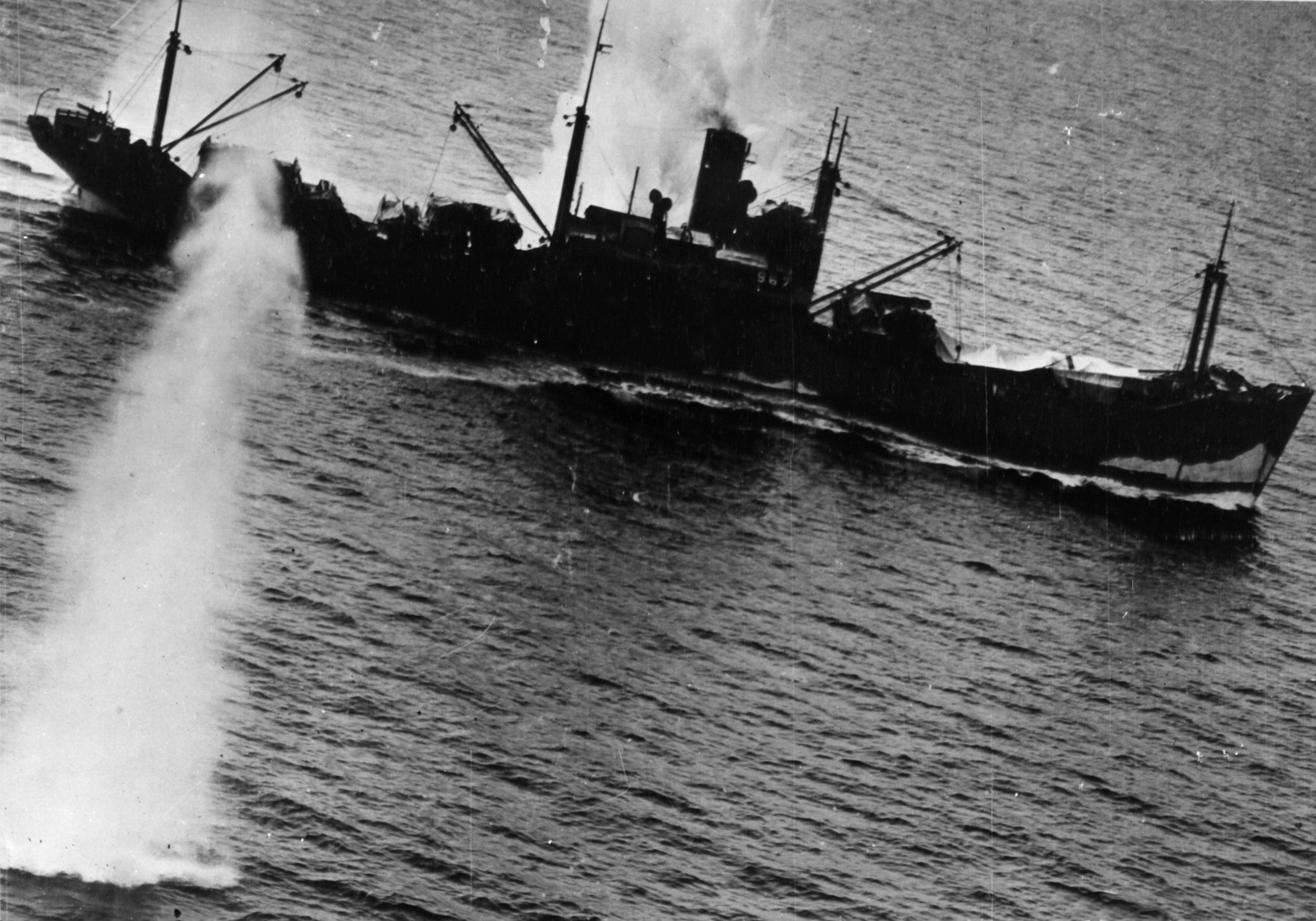
- Taimei Maru straddled by bombs in March 1943

History

Japan
- Name: Taimei Maru
- Owner: Kinkai Yusen K.K.; Nippon Yusen K.K.
- Builder: Mitsubishi Jukogyo K.K., Yokohama
- Completed: July 1936
- Fate: Sunk by aircraft on 3 March 1943 at 07°15'S, 148°30'E

General characteristics
- Tonnage: 2,883 GRT; 1,450 NRT
- Length: 326.2 feet (99.4 m)
- Beam: 44.2 feet (13.5 m)
- Draught: 24 feet (7.3 m)
- Installed power: 284 NHP
- Propulsion: Triple expansion engines

Taimei Maru was a 2,883 ton transport ship of the Imperial Japanese Army during World War II.

Built by Mitsubishi Jukogyo K.K., Yokohama and launched in 1936 for Kinkai Yusen K.K. She was sold in 1939 to Nippon Yusen K.K..

She left Rabaul, New Britain on 1 March 1943, as part of Operation 81, carrying a cargo of troops, equipment, fuel, landing craft and ammunition for Lae, New Guinea. The convoy was attacked by aircraft of the United States Army Air Forces and Royal Australian Air Force from 2 March 1943, known as the Battle of the Bismarck Sea. Taimei Maru was bombed on 3 March and sank at 07°15'S., 148°30'E.
Of those aboard, some 200 were killed during the attack.
