= Japanese transport Kembu Maru =

Transport ship of the Imperial Japanese Army

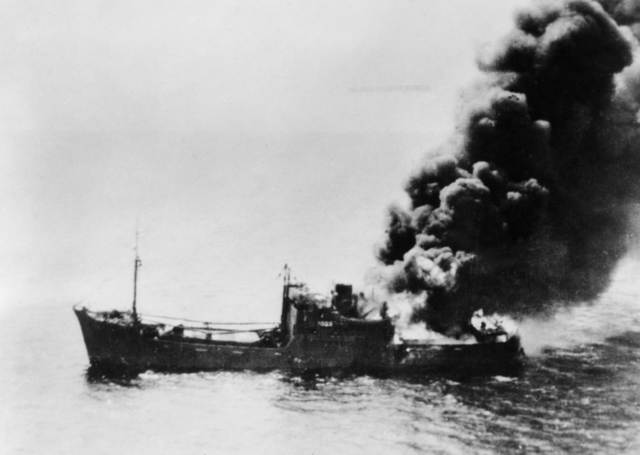
- Kenbu Maru under attack by Allied aircraft during the battle of the Bismarck Sea

History

Japan
- Name: Kembu Maru
- Builder: Nakata Zosen
- Fate: Sunk by aircraft on 3 March 1943 at 07°15'S, 148°30'E

General characteristics
- Tonnage: 953 tons

Kembu Maru was a 953-ton transport ship of Imperial Japanese Army during World War II.

She left Rabaul, New Britain, on 1 March 1943, as part of Operation 81, carrying a cargo of 1,000 drums of avgas and 650 drums of other fuel for Lae, New Guinea.

The convoy was attacked by aircraft of the United States Army Air Forces and Royal Australian Air Force from 2 March 1943, known as the Battle of the Bismarck Sea. Kembu Maru was bombed on 3 March; she exploded in a giant fireball and sank at 07°15'S., 148°30'E; 20 troops were killed in action.
