= 115th Infantry Regiment (Imperial Japanese Army) =

- Active: World War II
- Branch: Infantry
- Part of: 51st Division
- Engagements: Second Sino-Japanese War; New Guinea Campaign

The 115th Infantry Regiment was an infantry regiment in the Imperial Japanese Army. The regiment was attached to the 127th Infantry Brigade of the 114th Division and participated during the Second Sino-Japanese War. It was later reassigned to the 51st Division and during the later stages of World War II, the regiment was in New Guinea, as part of the Japanese Eighteenth Army.

== Organization ==
- 1st Battalion
- 2nd Battalion
- 3rd Battalion
