= SS Pruth (1916) =

Coordinates: 9°32′52″S 147°10′47″E

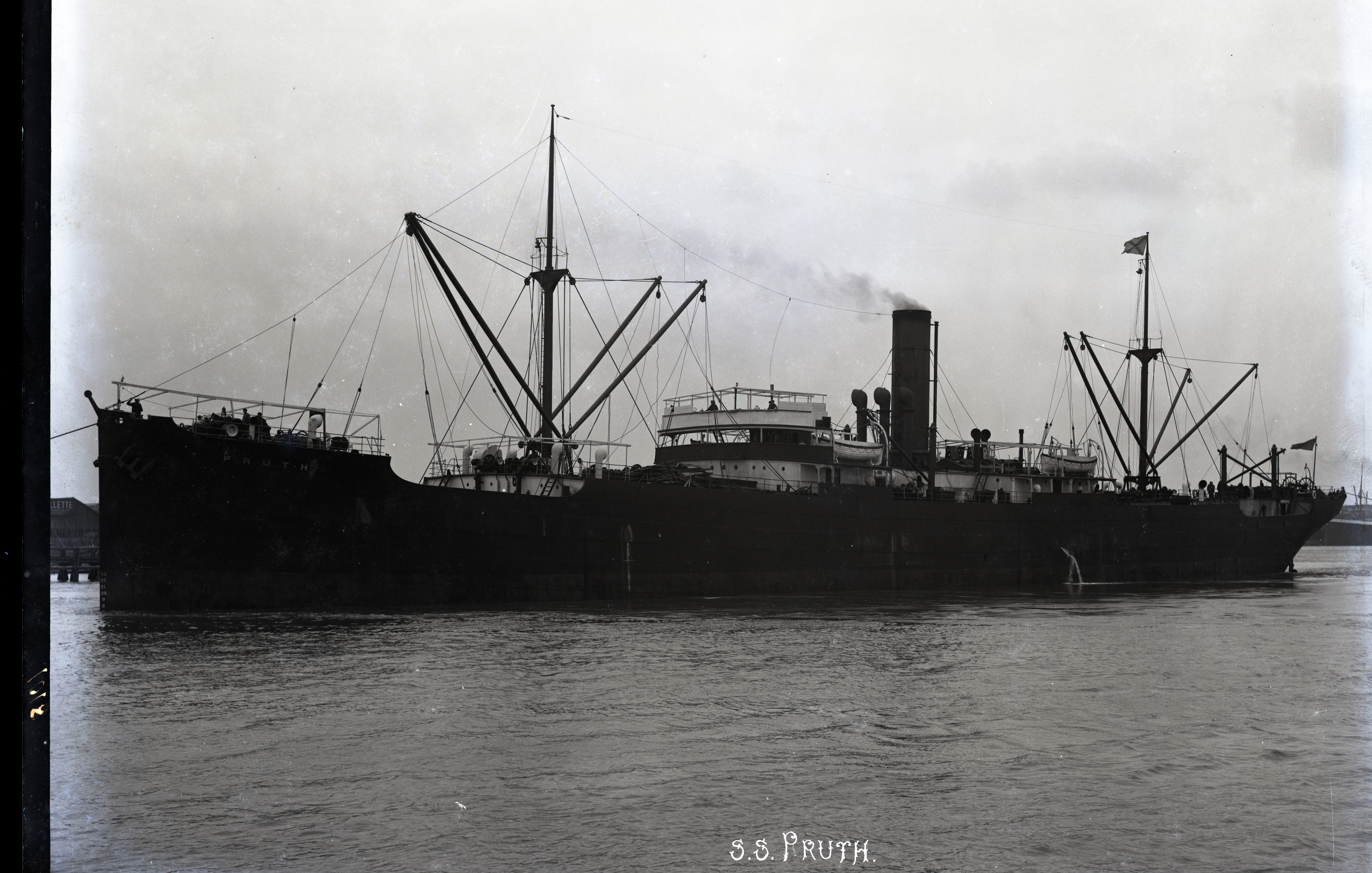

History
- Name: SS Pruth
- Owner: Hain Steamship Company
- Builder: J.L. Thompson and Sons, Sunderland
- Yard number: 511
- Identification: Official number: 1139109
- Fate: Wrecked upon Nateara Reef, Port Moresby in 1923

General characteristics
- Tonnage: 4698 gross register
- Length: 121.9 metres (400 ft)
- Beam: 16.2 metres (53 ft)
- Depth: 7.9 metres (26 ft)
- Installed power: 421 n.h.p.
- Propulsion: Triple expansion engine
- Speed: 10 knots

SS Pruth was a 4698 gross register ton steamship built by J.L. Thompson and Sons, Sunderland for the Hain Steamship Company in 1916. The ship was on a voyage from New York to Cairns, via Port Moresby when she was wrecked upon Nateara Reef near Port Moresby on 31 December 1923. Attempts to salvage her failed. Her wreck became known as the "Moresby Wreck".

Her wreck was used for strafing and bombing practice by the United States Army Air Forces Fifth Air Force and the Royal Australian Air Force in 1942 and 1943 during World War II. Six Allied aircraft crashed while undertaking the strafing and bombing practice.
