= New Guinea campaign =

Part of World War II

- Part of the Pacific Theater of World War II
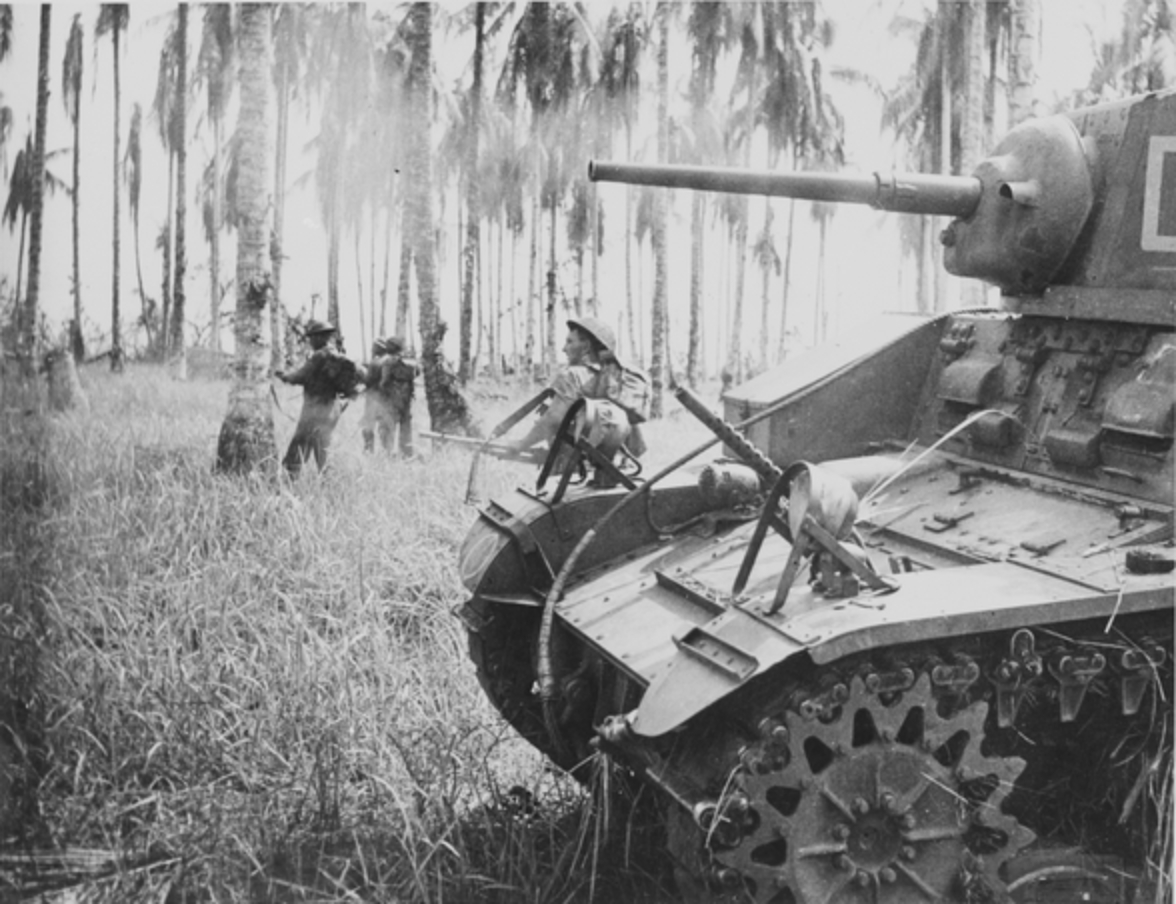
- Australian forces attack Japanese positions near Buna
Date	23 January 1942 – 15 August 1945
Location	Australian Papua and New Guinea; Dutch New Guinea
Result	Allied victory

Belligerents
Australia: Papua; New Guinea; United States; United Kingdom; Netherlands	Empire of Japan

Commanders and leaders
Douglas MacArthur; Thomas Blamey; George Kenney; Robert Eichelberger; Arthur Carpender	(Empire of Japan) Hitoshi Imamura; (Empire of Japan) Hatazō Adachi; (Empire of Japan) Tomitarō Horii; (Empire of Japan) Isoroku Yamamoto †; (Empire of Japan) Jisaburō Ozawa; (Empire of Japan) Jinichi Kusaka

Strength
	350,000

Casualties and losses
42,000 total: (Australia) (c. 7,000 killed); (United States) 12,291 (4,684 killed)	202,100 total dead: 127,600 on New Guinea main island; 44,000 on Bougainville; 30,500 on New Britain, New Ireland, and the Admiralty Islands

The New Guinea campaign of the Pacific War lasted from January 1942 until the end of the war in August 1945. During the initial phase in early 1942, the Empire of Japan invaded the Territory of New Guinea on 23 January and Territory of Papua on 21 July and overran western New Guinea (part of the Netherlands East Indies) beginning on 29 March. During the second phase, lasting from late 1942 until the Japanese surrender, the Allies—consisting primarily of Australian forces—cleared the Japanese first from Papua, then New Guinea, and finally from the Dutch colony.

The campaign resulted in a crushing defeat and heavy losses for the Empire of Japan. As in most Pacific War campaigns, disease and starvation claimed more Japanese lives than enemy action. Most Japanese troops never even came into contact with Allied forces and were instead simply cut off and subjected to an effective blockade by Allied naval forces. Garrisons were effectively besieged and denied shipments of food and medical supplies, and as a result, some researchers claim that 97% of Japanese deaths in this campaign were from non-combat causes. According to historian John Laffin, the campaign "was arguably the most arduous fought by any Allied troops during World War II."

== 1942 ==
=== Capture of Rabaul ===
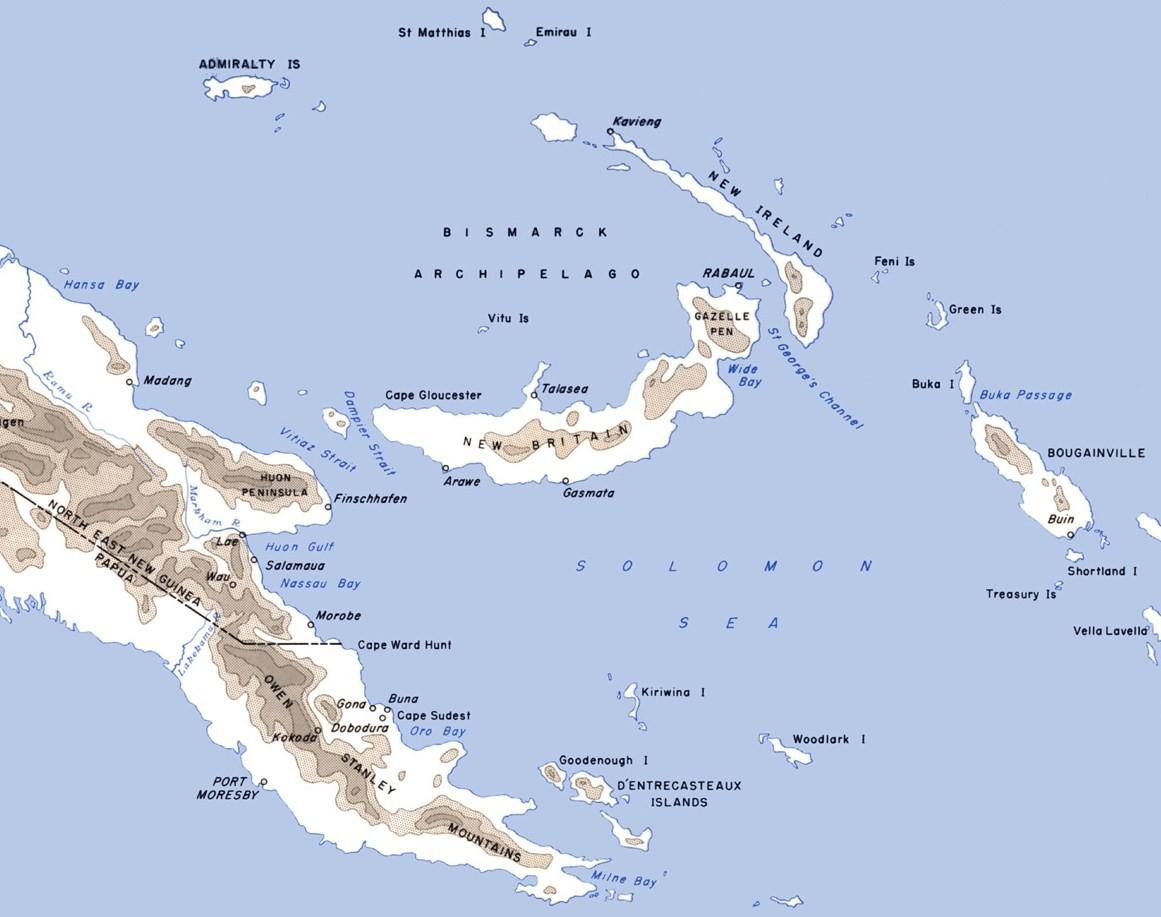
Papua New Guinea, the Bismarcks and the Northern Solomons

The struggle for New Guinea began with the capture by the Japanese of the city of Rabaul at the northeastern tip of New Britain in January 1942. Rabaul overlooks Simpson Harbour, a considerable natural anchorage and was ideal for the construction of airfields. Over the next year, the Japanese built up the area into a major air and naval base. The Allies responded with multiple bombing raids on Rabaul as well as action off Bougainville.

The Japanese Eighth Area Army, under General Hitoshi Imamura at Rabaul, was responsible for both the New Guinea and Solomon Islands campaigns, while the Japanese 18th Army, under Lieutenant General Hatazō Adachi, was responsible for Japanese ground operations on mainland New Guinea.

The colonial capital of Port Moresby on the south coast of Papua was the strategic key for the Japanese in this area of operations. Capturing it would both neutralize the Allies' principal forward base and serve as a springboard for a possible invasion of Australia. For the same reasons, General Douglas MacArthur, Supreme Commander Allied Forces South West Pacific Area, was determined to hold it. MacArthur was further determined to conquer all of New Guinea in his progress toward the eventual recapture of the Philippines.

=== Seizure of Lae and Salamaua ===
Due north of Port Moresby, on the northeast coast of Papua, are the Huon Gulf and the Huon Peninsula. The Japanese entered Lae and Salamaua, two towns on Huon Gulf, on 8 March 1942, unopposed. MacArthur would have liked to deny this area to the Japanese, but he had neither sufficient air nor naval forces to undertake a counterlanding. The Japanese at Rabaul and other bases on New Britain would have easily overwhelmed any such effort (by mid-September, MacArthur's entire naval force under Vice Admiral Arthur S. Carpender consisted of 5 cruisers, 8 destroyers, 20 submarines, and 7 small craft). The only Allied response was a bombing raid of Lae and Salamaua by aircraft flying over the Owen Stanley Range from the carriers USS Lexington and USS Yorktown, leading the Japanese to reinforce these sites.

=== Attempt on Port Moresby ===
Operation Mo was the designation given by the Japanese to their initial plan to take possession of Port Moresby. Their operation plan decreed a five-pronged attack: one task force to establish a seaplane base at Tulagi in the lower Solomons, one to establish a seaplane base in the Louisiade Archipelago off the eastern tip of New Guinea, one of transports to land troops near Port Moresby, one with a light carrier to cover the landing, and one with two fleet carriers to sink the Allied forces sent in response. In the resulting 4–8 May 1942 Battle of the Coral Sea, the Allies suffered higher losses in ships but achieved a crucial strategic victory by turning the Japanese landing force back, thereby removing the threat to Port Moresby, at least for the time being.

After this failure, the Japanese decided on a longer term, two-pronged assault for their next attempt on Port Moresby. Forward positions would first be established at Milne Bay, located in the forked eastern end of the Papuan peninsula, and at Buna, a village on the northeast coast of Papua about halfway between Huon Gulf and Milne Bay. Simultaneous operations from these two locations, one amphibious and one overland, would converge on the target city.

=== Creation of New Guinea Force ===
General Headquarters South West Pacific Area Operational Instruction No.7 of 25 May 1942 issued by General MacArthur placed all Australian and US Army, Air Force and Navy Forces in the Port Moresby Area under the control of New Guinea Force. In July 1942, this new unit was placed under the command of Lieutenant General Sydney Rowell who thereafter directed the defense of Port Morseby and the containment of the Japanese offensive along the Kokoda Trail. However, after incurring MacArthur's disapproval through his successive retreats along the Trail, Rowell and his New Guinea Force were placed under the direct supervision of the AMF Commander-in-Chief, Sir Thomas Blamey, in September. By October 1942, Blamey had relieved Rowell of his command and replaced him with Lieutenant General Edmund Herring who subsequently oversaw Allied land operations in New Guinea until August 1943.

=== Kokoda Track ===
"[T]he Owen Stanley Range is a jagged, precipitous obstacle covered with tropical rainforest up to the pass at 6500-foot elevation, and with moss like a thick wet sponge up to the highest peaks, 13,000 feet above the sea. The Kokoda Trail [was] suitable for splay-toed Papuan aborigines but a torture to modern soldiers carrying heavy equipment..."

— Samuel Eliot Morison, Breaking the Bismarcks Barrier, p. 34

Buna was easily taken as the Allies had no military presence there (MacArthur wisely chose not to attempt an occupation by paratroopers since any such force would have been easily wiped out by the Japanese). The Japanese occupied the village with an initial force of 1,500 on 21 July 1942 and by 22 August had 11,430 men under arms at Buna.

The Japanese objective was to seize Port Moresby by an overland advance from the north coast, following the Kokoda Track over the mountains of the Owen Stanley Range, as part of a strategy to isolate Australia from the United States. By 17 September the Japanese had reached the village of Ioribaiwa, just 30 kilometres (20 mi) from the Allied airdrome at Port Moresby. The Australians held firm and began their counterdrive on 26 September. According to historian Samuel Eliot Morison, "...the Japanese retreat down the Kokoda Track had turned into a rout. Thousands perished from starvation and disease; the commanding general, Tomitarō Horii, was drowned." (Note: Horii drowned after his canoe was swept out to sea and capsized during a storm, however, his orderly survived to report his death.) Thus was the overland threat to Port Moresby permanently removed.

=== Air operations ===
Since Port Moresby was the only port supporting operations in Papua, its defence was critical to the campaign. The air defences consisted of P-39 and P-40 fighters. Royal Australian Air Force (RAAF) radar could not provide sufficient warning of Japanese attacks, so reliance was placed on coastwatchers and spotters in the hills until an American radar unit arrived in September with better equipment. Japanese bombers were often escorted by fighters which came in at 30,000 ft (9,100 m)—too high to be intercepted by the P-39s and P-40s—giving the Japanese an altitude advantage in air combat. The cost to the Allied fighters was high. Before June, between 20 and 25 P-39s had been lost in air combat, while three more had been destroyed on the ground, and eight had been destroyed in landings by accident. The following month at least 20 fighters were lost in combat, while eight were destroyed in July.

The Australian and American anti-aircraft gunners of the Composite Anti-Aircraft Defences played a crucial role in protecting Port Moresby, which suffered 78 air raids by 17 August 1942. A gradual improvement in the numbers and skill of anti-aircraft gunners forced the Japanese bombers up to higher altitude, where they were less accurate, and then, in August, to raiding by night.

Although RAAF PBY Catalinas and Lockheed Hudsons were based at Port Moresby, because of the Japanese air attacks, long-range bombers like B-17s, B-25s, and B-26s could not be safely based there and were instead staged through from bases in Australia. This resulted in considerable fatigue for the air crews. Due to USAAF doctrine and a lack of long-range escorts, long-range bomber raids on targets like Rabaul went in unescorted and suffered heavy losses, prompting severe criticism of Lieutenant General George Brett by war correspondents for misusing his forces. But fighters did provide cover for the transports and for bombers when their targets were within range. Aircraft based at Port Moresby and Milne Bay fought to prevent the Japanese from basing aircraft at Buna, and attempted to prevent the Japanese reinforcement of the Buna area. As the Japanese ground forces pressed toward Port Moresby, the Allied Air Forces struck supply points along the Kokoda Track. Japanese makeshift bridges were attacked by P-40s with 500 lb (230 kg) bombs.

=== Allied defence of Milne Bay ===
"Thenceforth, the Battle of Milne Bay became an infantry struggle in the sopping jungle carried on mostly at night under pouring rain. The Aussies were fighting mad, for they had found some of their captured fellows tied to trees and bayoneted to death, surmounted by the placard, 'It took them a long time to die'."

— Samuel Eliot Morison, Breaking the Bismarcks Barrier, p. 38

While it was beyond MacArthur's capabilities to deny Buna to the Japanese, the same could not be said of Milne Bay, which was easily accessible by Allied naval forces. In early June, US Army engineers, Australian infantry and an anti-aircraft battery were landed at Gili Gili, and work was begun on an airfield. By 22 August, about 8,500 Australians and 1,300 Americans were on site. The Japanese arrived and the 25 August – 7 September Battle of Milne Bay was underway. Morison sums up the results this way:

...the enemy had shot his bolt; he never showed up again in these waters. The Battle for Milne Bay was a small one as World War II engagements went, but very important. Except for the initial assault on Wake Island, this was the first time that a Japanese amphibious operation had been thrown for a loss ... Furthermore, the Milne Bay affair demonstrated once again that an amphibious assault without air protection, and with an assault force inferior to that of the defenders, could not succeed.

The D'Entrecasteaux Islands lie directly off the northeast coast of the lower portion of the Papuan peninsula. The westernmost island of this group, Goodenough, had been occupied in August 1942 by 353 stranded troops from bombed Japanese landing craft. The destroyer Yayoi, sent to recover these men, was bombed and sunk on 11 September. A force of 800 Australian troops landed on 22 October on either side of the Japanese position. Beleaguered, the survivors of the Japanese garrison were evacuated by submarine on the night of 26 October. The Allies proceeded to turn the island into an air base.

=== Allied recapture of Buna and Gona ===
"In the swamp country which surrounded the area were large crocodiles ... Incidence of malaria was almost one hundred per cent. At Sanananda the swamp and jungle were typhus-ridden ... crawling roots reached out into stagnant pools infested with mosquitoes and numerous crawling insects ... every foxhole filled with water. Thompson sub machine-guns jammed with the gritty mud and were unreliable in the humid atmosphere ... "

— John Vader, New Guinea: The Tide Is Stemmed, pp. 102–103

The Japanese drive to conquer all of New Guinea had been decisively stopped. MacArthur was determined to liberate the island as a stepping-stone to the reconquest of the Philippines. MacArthur's rollback began on 16 November. The inexperience of the US 32nd Infantry Division, just out of training camp and unschooled in jungle warfare, was nearly disastrous. Instances were noted of officers completely out of their depth, of men eating meals when they should have been on the firing line, even of cowardice. MacArthur relieved the division commander and on 30 November instructed Lieutenant General Robert L. Eichelberger, commander of the US I Corps, to go to the front personally with the charge "to remove all officers who won't fight ... if necessary, put sergeants in charge of battalions ... I want you to take Buna, or not come back alive."

The Australian 7th Division under the command of Major General George Alan Vasey, along with the revitalized US 32nd Division, restarted the Allied offensive. Gona fell to the Australians on 9 December 1942, Buna to the US 32nd on 2 January 1943, and Sanananda, located between the two larger villages, fell to the Australians on 22 January.

Operation Lilliput (18 December 1942 – June 1943) was an ongoing resupply operation ferrying troops and supplies from Milne Bay to Oro Bay, a little more than halfway between Milne Bay and the Buna–Gona area.

== 1943 ==
=== Battle of Wau ===
Wau is a village in the interior of the Papuan Peninsula, approximately 50 kilometres (30 mi) southwest of Salamaua. An airfield had been built there during an area gold rush in the 1920s and 1930s. This airfield was of great value to the Australians during the fighting for northeast Papua.

Once the Japanese had decided to give up on Guadalcanal, the capture of Port Moresby loomed even larger in their strategic thinking. Taking the airfield at Wau was a crucial step in this process, and to this end, the 51st Division was transferred from Indochina and placed under Imamura's Eighth Area Army at Rabaul; one regiment arrived at Lae in early January 1943. In addition, about 5,400 survivors of the Japanese defeat at Buna-Gona were moved into the Lae-Salamaua area. Opposing these forces were the Australian 2/5th, 2/6th and 2/7th Battalions along with Lieutenant Colonel Norman Fleay's Kanga Force.

The Australians decisively turned back the Japanese assault in the ensuing 29–31 January 1943 Battle of Wau. "Within a few days, the enemy was retreating from the Wau Valley, where he had suffered a serious defeat, harassed all the way back to Mubo..." About one week later, the Japanese completed their evacuation of Guadalcanal.

=== Japanese drive on Wau ===
General Imamura and his naval counterpart at Rabaul, Admiral Jinichi Kusaka, commander Southeast Area Fleet, resolved to reinforce their ground forces at Lae for one final all-out attempt against Wau. If the transports succeeded in staying behind a weather front and were protected the whole way by fighters from the various airfields surrounding the Bismarck Sea, they might make it to Lae with an acceptable level of loss, i.e., at worst half the task force would be sunk en route.

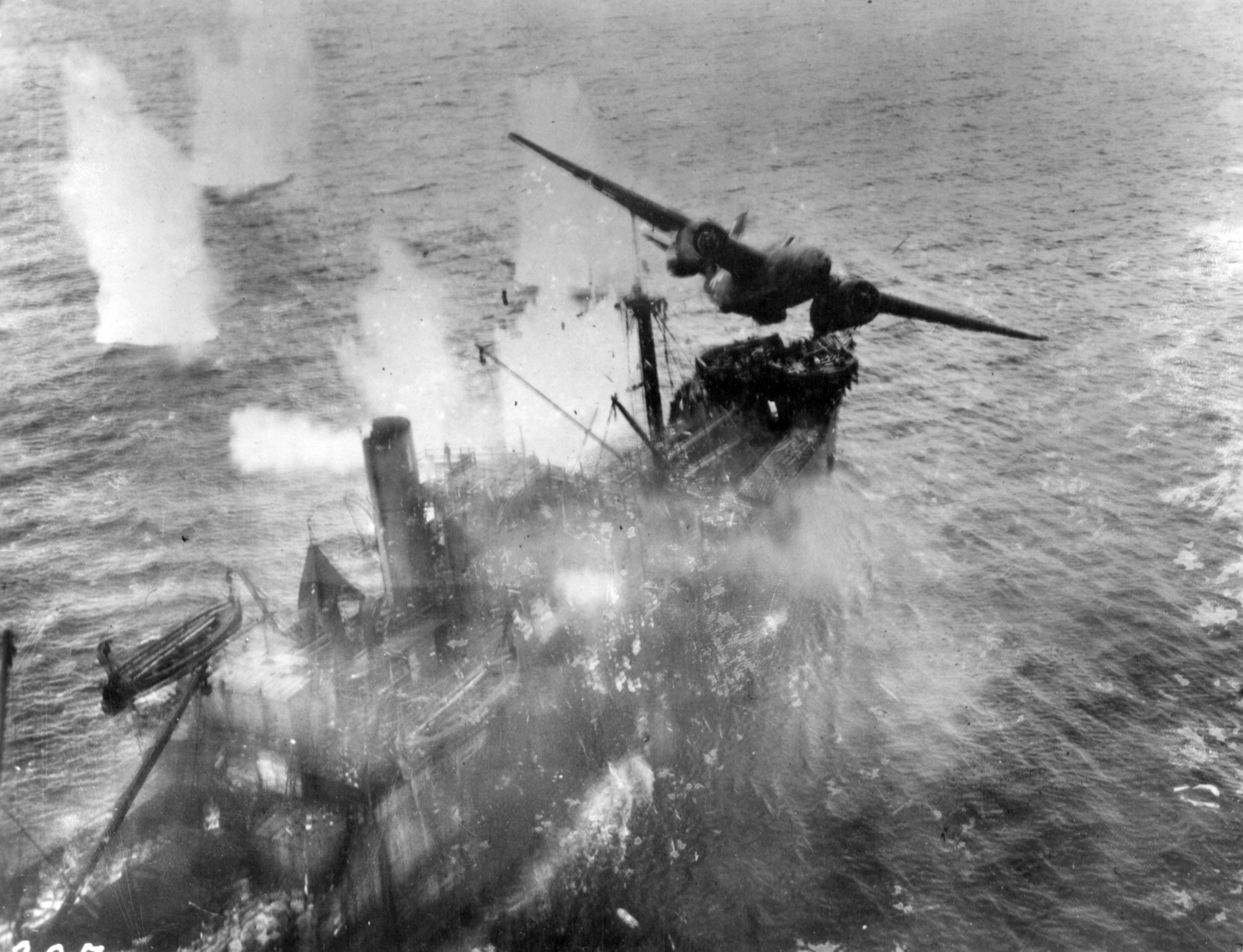
An Allied A-20 bomber attacks Japanese shipping during the Battle of the Bismarck Sea, March, 1943

Three factors conspired to create disaster for the Japanese. First, they had woefully underestimated the strength of the Allied air forces. Second, the Allies had become convinced that the Japanese were preparing a major seaborne reinforcement and so had stepped up their air searches. Most important of all, the bombers of MacArthur's air forces, under the command of Lieutenant General George C. Kenney, had been modified to enable new offensive tactics. The noses of several Douglas A-20 Havoc light bombers had been refitted with eight .50-caliber machine guns for strafing slow-moving ships. In addition, their bomb bays were filled with 500-pound bombs to be used in the newly devised practice of skip bombing.

About 6,900 troops aboard eight transports, escorted by eight destroyers, departed Rabaul at midnight 28 February under the command of Rear Admiral Masatomi Kimura. Through the afternoon of 1 March, the overcast weather held at which point everything began to go wrong for the Japanese. The weather changed direction and Kimura's slow-moving task force was spotted by an Allied scout plane. By the time the Allied bombers and PT boats finished their work on 3 March, Kimura had lost all eight transports and four of his eight destroyers.

The remaining destroyers with about 2,700 surviving troops limped back to Rabaul. According to Morison, the Japanese "...never again risked a transport larger than a small coaster or barge in waters shadowed by American planes. His contemplated offensive against Wau died a-borning."

=== Operation I-Go ===
Combined Fleet, Third Fleet and Southeast Area Commanders

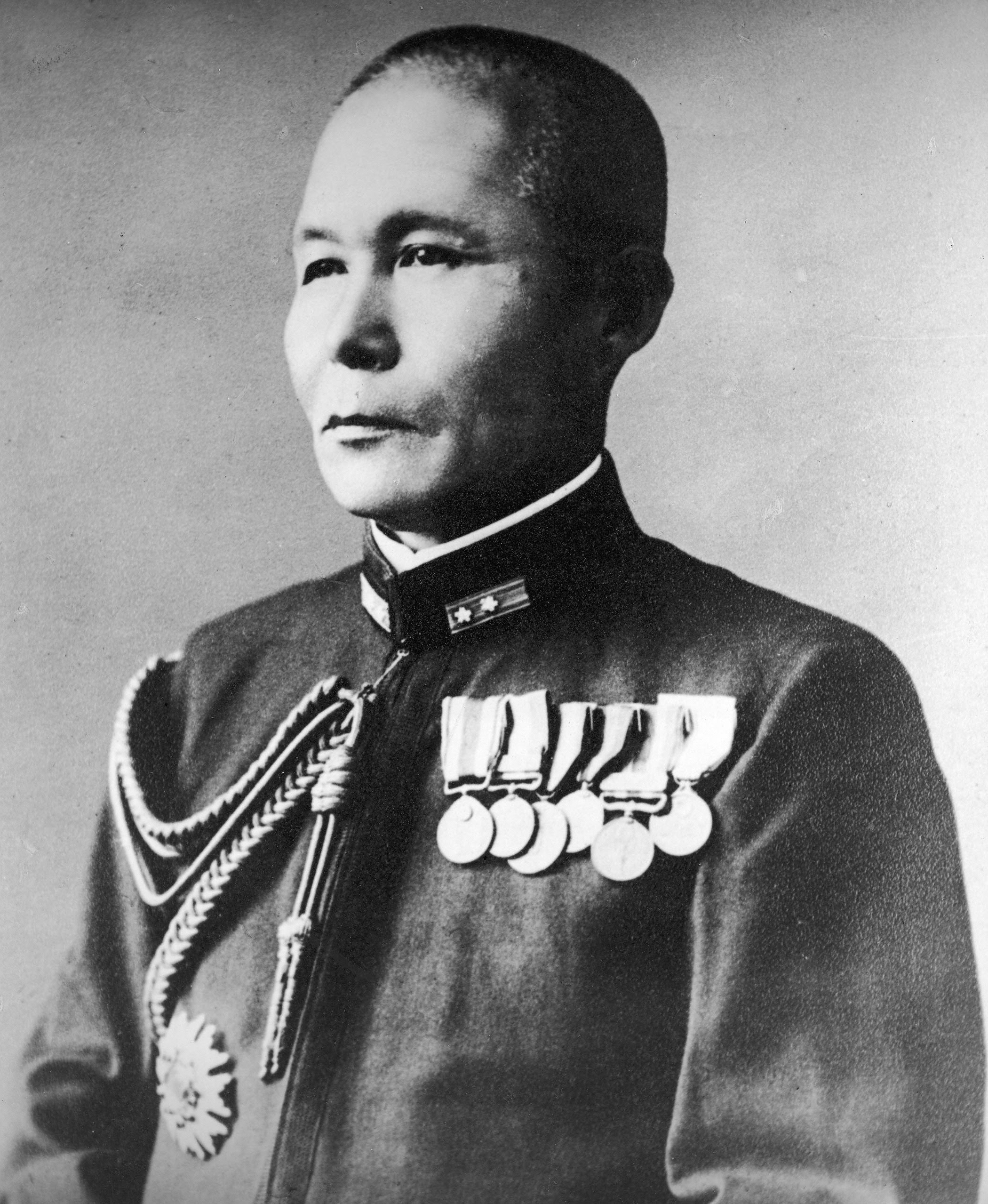
Vice Admiral Jisaburo Ozawa

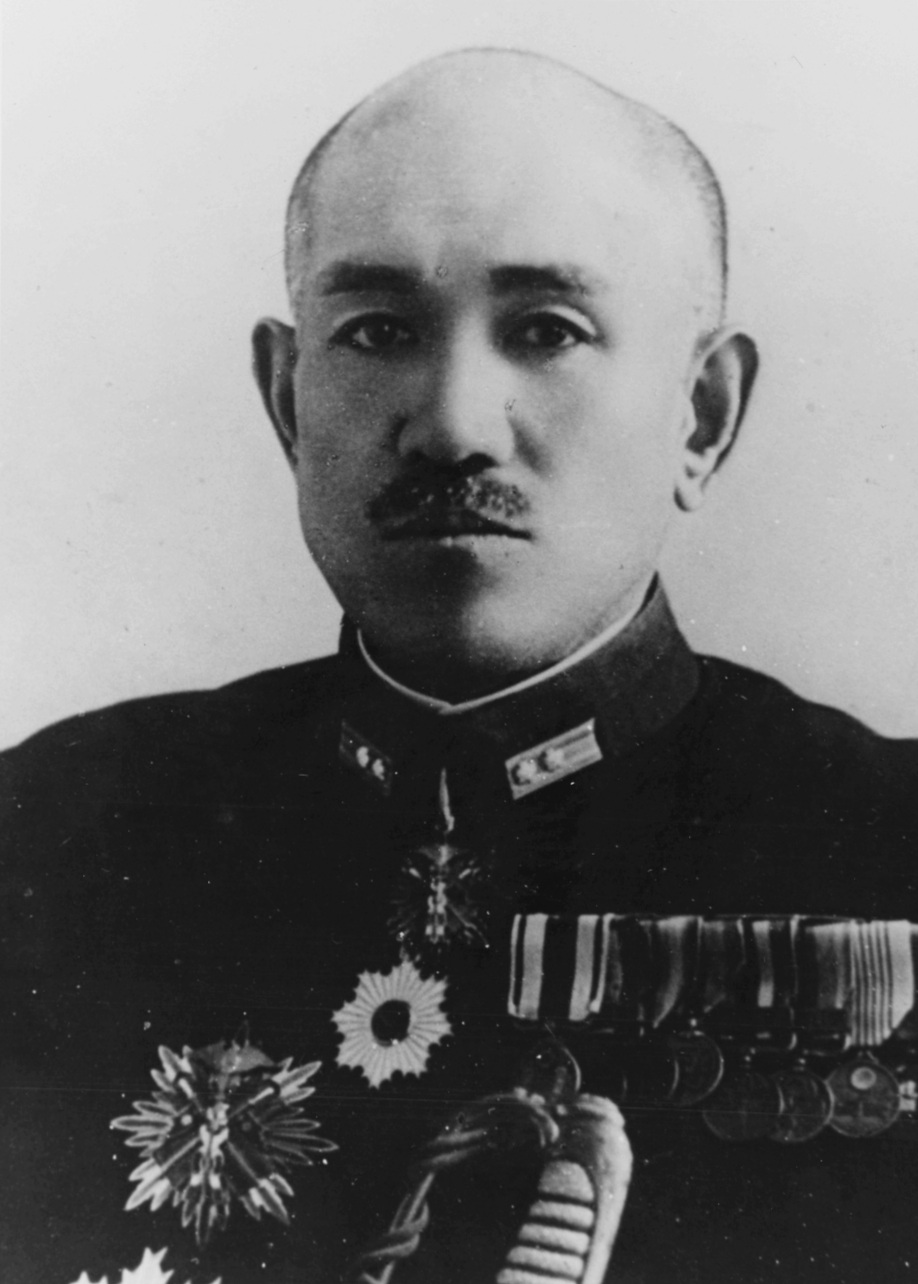
Vice Admiral Jinichi Kusaka

Admiral Isoroku Yamamoto promised the emperor that he would pay back the Allies for the disaster at the Bismarck Sea with a series of massive airstrikes. For this, he ordered the air arm of Vice Admiral Jisaburō Ozawa's Third Fleet carriers to reinforce the Eleventh Air Fleet at Rabaul. To demonstrate the seriousness of the effort to the Supreme War Council, multiple shifts of high-ranking personnel were also effected: both Yamamoto and Ozawa moved their headquarters to Rabaul; and Eighth Fleet commander Vice Admiral Gunichi Mikawa as well as General Imamura's chief of staff were sent to Tokyo with advice and explanations for the respective General Staffs (Vice Admiral Tomoshige Samejima replaced Mikawa as Eighth Fleet commander).

Operation I-Go was to be carried out in two phases, one against the lower Solomons and one against Papua. The first strike, on 7 April, was against Allied shipping in the waters between Guadalcanal and Tulagi. At 177 planes, this was the largest Japanese air attack since Pearl Harbor. Yamamoto then turned his attention to New Guinea: 94 planes struck Oro Bay on 11 April; 174 planes hit Port Moresby on 12 April; and in the largest raid of all, 188 aircraft struck Milne Bay on 14 April.

I-Go demonstrated that the Japanese command was not learning the lessons of air power that the Allies were. The Allied reduction of Rabaul was only made possible by relentless air strikes that took place day after day, but Yamamoto thought the damage inflicted by a few attacks of large formations would derail Allied plans long enough for Japan to prepare a defence in depth. Also, Yamamoto accepted at face value his fliers' over-optimistic reports of damage: they reported a score of one cruiser, two destroyers and 25 transports, as well as 175 Allied planes, a figure that should certainly have aroused some skepticism. Actual Allied losses amounted to one destroyer, one oiler, one corvette, two cargo ships and approximately 25 aircraft. These meager results were not commensurate with either the resources expended or the expectations that had been promoted.

=== Allied strategy toward Rabaul ===
In order to reduce and capture the vast Japanese naval and air facilities at Rabaul, two major moves were planned for the end of June:

- Rear Admiral Richmond K. Turner's Task Force 31 undertook the New Georgia campaign (Operation Toenails), the invasion of the New Georgia Islands halfway up the Solomons chain (30 June – 7 October 1943).
- Rear Admiral Daniel E. Barbey's Task Force 76 carried out two back-to-back landings. Operation Chronicle, the capture of the Trobriand Islands between Papua and the Solomons (22 – 30 June 1943), and the landing of a combined American/Australian force at Nassau Bay on the Papuan coast just south of Huon Gulf (30 June – 6 July 1943).

Eventually, the Joint Chiefs of Staff realized that a landing and siege of "Fortress Rabaul" would be far too costly and that the Allies' ultimate strategic purposes could be achieved by simply neutralizing and bypassing it. At the Quebec Conference in August 1943, the leaders of the Allied nations agreed to this change in strategy focusing on neutralizing Rabaul rather than capturing it.

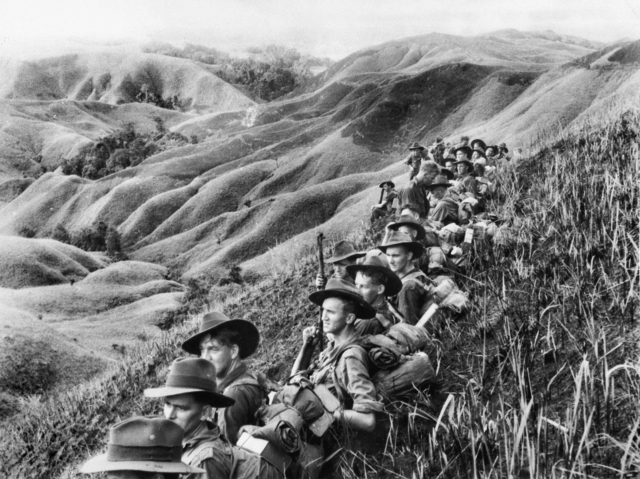
Australian soldiers resting in the Finisterre Ranges of New Guinea while en route to the front line

=== From Wau to Salamaua ===
Despite the disaster of the Bismarck Sea, the Japanese could not give up on recapturing Wau, and they kept significant resources in the territory of Papua, on north shore of the eastern end New Guinea. The Australians were there to restrict Japanese build up there, as any base construction or build up there would threaten the southern shore of New Guinea and across the sea to the northern shores of Australia.

- Salamaua-Lae campaign (22 April – 16 Sep 1943)
  - Landing at Nassau Bay
  - First Battle of Mubo
  - First Battle of Bobdubi
  - Battle of Lababia Ridge
  - Second Battle of Bobdubi
  - Second Battle of Mubo
  - Battle of Roosevelt Ridge
  - Battle of Mount Tambu
  - 'Operation Postern
    - Landing at Lae
    - Landing at Nadzab
- Bombing of Wewak (17–21 August 1943)
- Finisterre Range campaign (1943–1944)
  - Battle of Kaiapit
  - Battle of Dumpu
  - Battle of John's Knoll–Trevor's Ridge
  - Battle of The Pimple
  - Battle of Shaggy Ridge
  - Battle of Madang
- Huon Peninsula campaign (22 September 1943 – 1 March 1944)
  - Battle of Scarlet Beach
  - Battle of Finschhafen
  - Battle of Sattelberg
  - Battle of Jivevaneng
  - Battle of Wareo
  - Battle of Sio
  - Landing at Saidor
- Bombing of Rabaul (November 1943)
- New Britain campaign (15 December 1943 – 21 August 1945)

== 1944–1945 ==
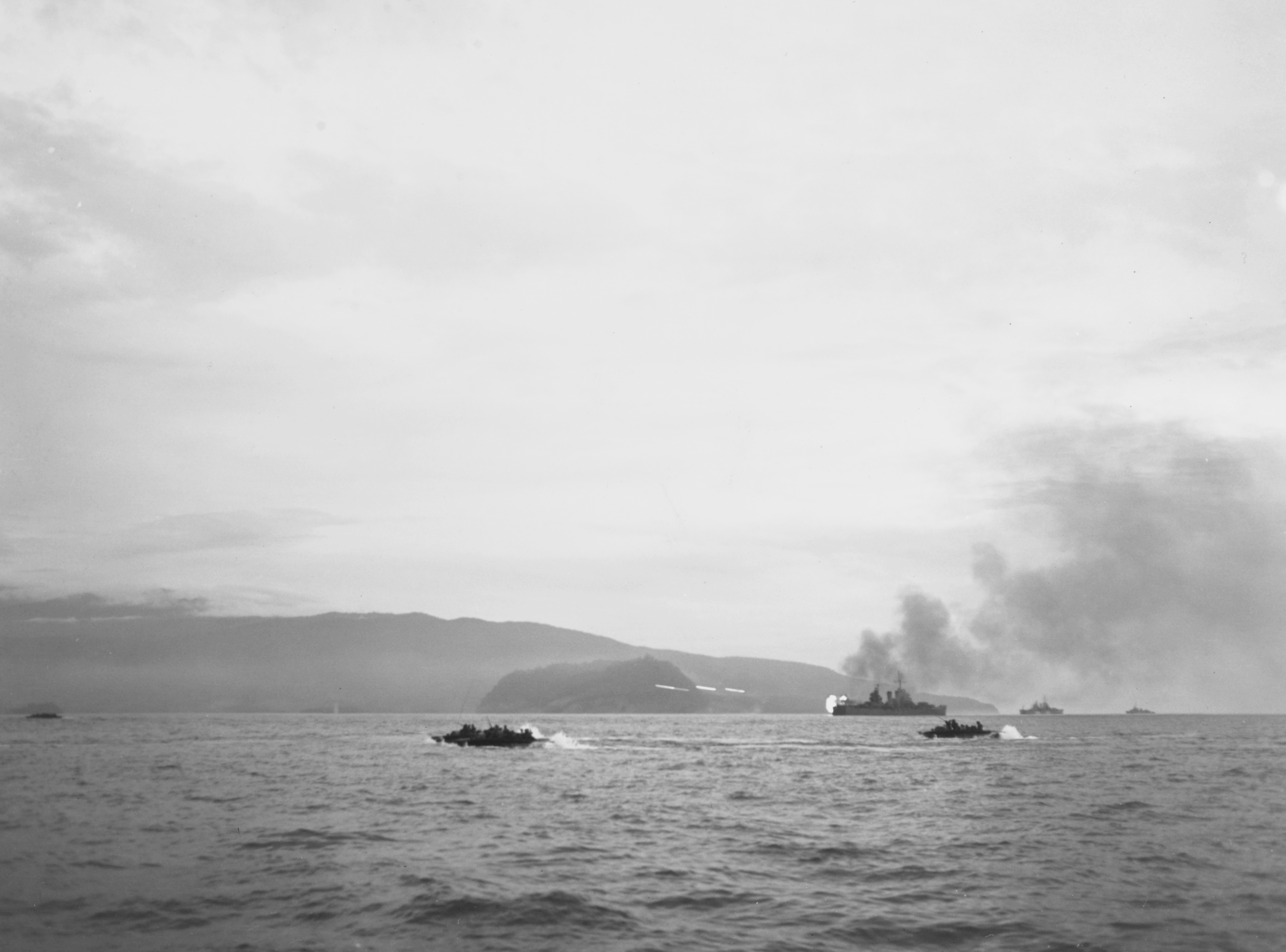
22 April 1944. US LVTs (Landing Vehicles Tracked) in the foreground head for the invasion beaches at Humboldt Bay, Netherlands New Guinea, during the Hollandia landing as the cruisers USS Boise (firing tracer shells, right center) and USS Phoenix bombard the shore. (Photographer: Tech 4 Henry C. Manger.)

- Admiralty Islands campaign (1944)
- Western New Guinea campaign (1944–1945)
  - Landing at Aitape
  - Landing at Hollandia
  - Take Ichi convoy
  - Battle of Wakde
  - Battle of Lone Tree Hill (1944)
  - Battle of Biak
  - Battle of Noemfoor
  - Battle of Driniumor River
  - Battle of Sansapor
  - Battle of Morotai
  - Aitape–Wewak campaign

== See also ==
- US Naval Base New Guinea
- Naval Base Milne Bay
- Onward Towards Our Noble Deaths

== Footnotes and citations ==
Footnotes

Citations
