= Battle of Mubo =

- Part of World War II, Pacific War
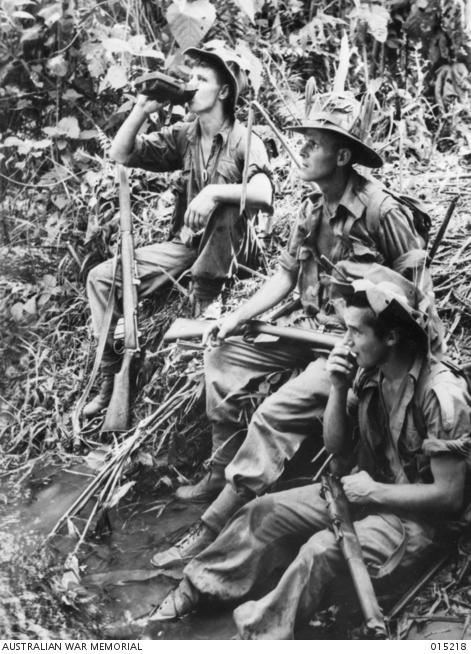
- An Australian patrol rests along the Mubo track, July 1943
| Date | 22 April 1943 – 14 July 1943 |
| Location | Territory of New Guinea 05°30′S 141°00′E |
| Result | Allied victory |

Belligerents
| Australia | Japan |

Commanders and leaders
| (Australia) Murray Moten | (Empire of Japan) Hidemitsu Nakano |

Units involved
| 17th Brigade: 2/5th Infantry Battalion; 2/6th Infantry Battalion; 2/7th Infantry Battalion | 51st Division: 66th Infantry Regiment; 102nd Infantry Regiment; 115th Infantry Regiment |

Strength
| Three battalions | 500 – 600 |

The Battle of Mubo was a series of actions in the Mubo area of the Territory of New Guinea between Australian and Japanese forces which took place between 22 April and 14 July 1943, during World War II. The battle formed part of the wider Salamaua–Lae campaign, and was fought in the early stages of the campaign. The battle followed the successful defence of the airfield around Wau by the Australians in late January 1943, after the Japanese had attempted to infiltrate the Australian positions with two infantry battalions.

After the fighting around Wau, the Japanese withdrew to the high ground around Mubo, where they were followed up by elements of the Australian 17th Brigade. In late April and early May, the Australians made several attempts to take several Japanese positions around Mubo, but were subsequently turned back by the Japanese who fought stubbornly to hold their positions. In early May, the Japanese launched a heavy counter-attack which fell against an isolated Australian company, who fought off the attack and inflicted heavy losses. After flanking moves failed in early July, Australian efforts to secure Mubo were renewed and the Japanese were finally forced to withdraw from the area towards Mount Tambu in mid-July.

== Background ==
In March 1942, the Japanese landed troops around Lae and Salamaua in the Australian mandated territory of New Guinea. A seaborne assault on Port Moresby was turned back in May at the Battle of the Coral Sea, after which the Japanese established a beachhead at Buna–Gona in late July as plans were made to capture Port Moresby via an overland route from the northern Papuan coast. Subsequently, heavy fighting took place during the Kokoda Track campaign and around Milne Bay. The Japanese advance ended just before their objective and subsequently the Australians went on the offensive, eventually pursuing the withdrawing Japanese back to their beachheads around Buna and Gona where the Australians linked up with US forces and heavy fighting followed against the Japanese between November 1942 and January 1943.

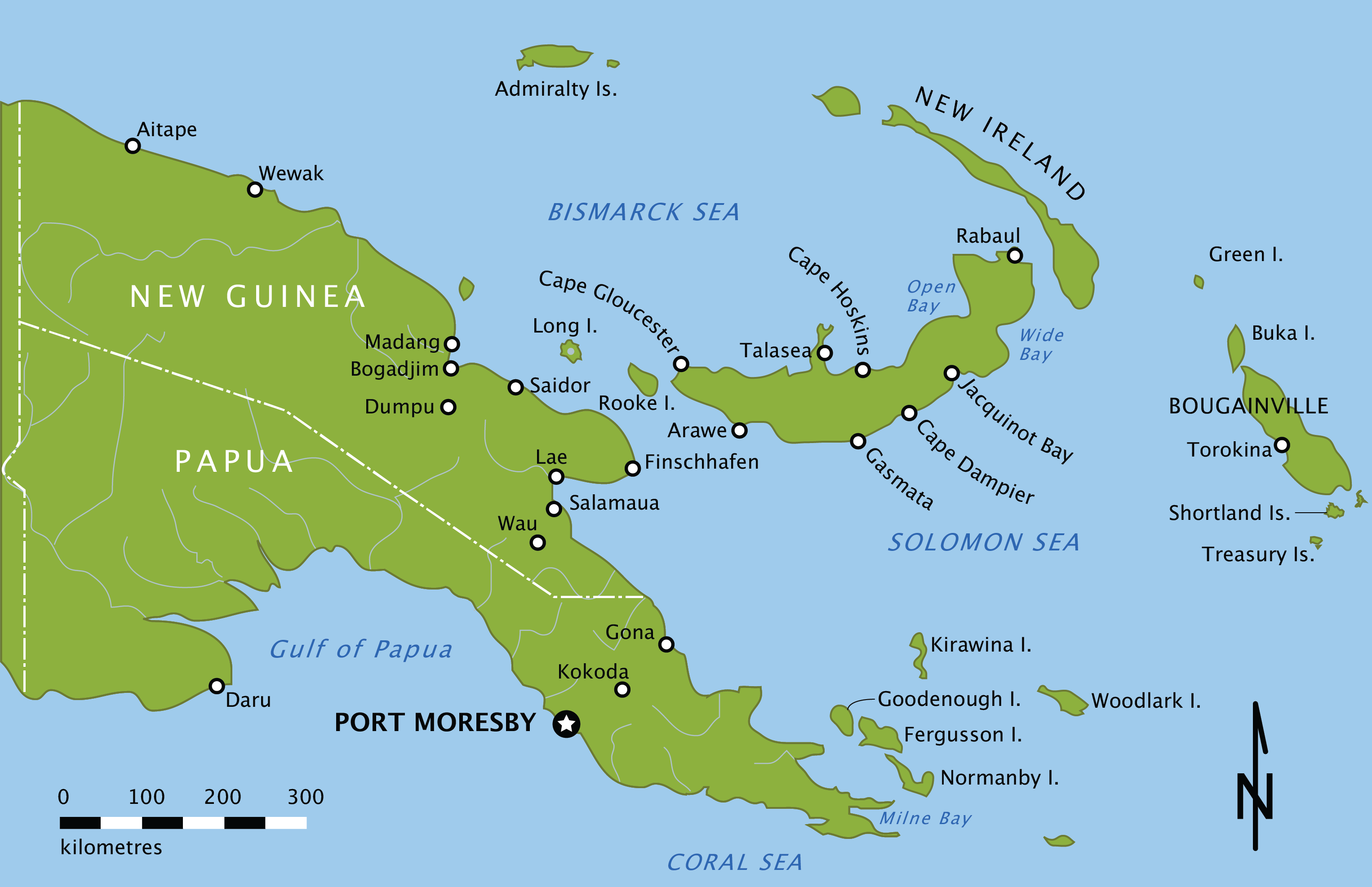
Area map of New Guinea and surrounds

While the fighting had been taking place further along the Kokoda Track, and around Milne Bay and Buna and Gona, small forces of Australians from the New Guinea Volunteer Rifles and commandos from Kanga Force had attempted to maintain contact with the Japanese in the north around Wau, Mubo and Salamaua. Operating in vicinity of the Japanese bases that had been established in the Huon Gulf region, during this time, the Australians limited themselves mainly to reconnaissance and observation operations, although in June 1942 raids were launched against Salamaua and against Heath's Plantation in Lae. In response, the Japanese brought in reinforcements and they subsequently advanced to Mubo and then Guadagasai.

In late January 1943, in the wake of their defeat around Buna and Gona, the Japanese had sought to shore up their hold of Lae by capturing Wau and establishing a perimeter. During the Battle of Wau the Australians, after flying in reinforcements, had repelled a Japanese attempt to capture the vital airfield around Wau with two infantry battalions. In the process, the last Japanese attempt to capture Port Moresby was turned back. In the aftermath, the Okabe Detachment, a brigade-sized formation under the command of Major General Toru Okabe, had withdrawn towards Mubo, where they began to regroup around an area of high ground around Waipali and Guadagasal, numbering about 800 strong. During the withdrawal from Mubo, it was estimated that the Japanese had lost 1,200 men mainly due to starvation. Following them up, the Australian force – consisting mainly of the 17th Brigade under the command of Brigadier Murray Moten – had advanced into the area surrounding Wau and had begun moving towards Mubo.

After reporting the withdrawal of large numbers of Japanese along the Buibaining–Waipali Track, in March the Australian 2/7th Independent Company began harassing Japanese troops around Mubo, as the Australians initially sought to screen the Wau position, and hold the Japanese at arm's length, while supply problems forward of Wau were resolved. In mid-March, the 2/5th Infantry Battalion occupied the Guadagasal Ridge, as Japanese forces in the area withdrew further following Allied bombing attacks and losses at sea during the Battle of the Bismarck Sea. Nevertheless, the Okabe Detachment was reinforced by marines from the Maizuru Special Naval Landing Party. In early April, patrols from the 2/5th clashed with the Japanese around Observation Hill on several occasions and later in the month the 2/7th Infantry Battalion was dispatched to relieve them, while the men from the 2/7th Independent Company were also relieved at this time. In an effort to defend the approaches to Wau, troops from the 2/7th Infantry established one company in a defensive position around Lababia Ridge, which was located about 2 kilometres (1.2 mi) south-west of Mubo; other companies were established at Waipali, as well as Mat Mat Hill – on the opposite bank of the Bitoi River – and further to the south around Hill 7. Meanwhile, the 17th Brigade was reinforced by the arrival of the 3rd Division's headquarters on 23 April 1943, with Major General Stanley Savige in command.

== Battle ==
Following the arrival of the 2/7th Infantry Battalion, the Australian brigade commander decided to pursue a limited offensive in the area. The Australians had been slowly trying to gain the initiative by patrolling, and in late April Moten decided to launch an attack on two features of high ground in front of their position: the Pimple and Green Hill. The plan called for an attack on the Pimple, which lay on the approaches to Green Hill, followed by an assault on the hill itself the following day. The initial assault went in on 24 April, following air attacks by Douglas A-20 Boston aircraft, which proved ineffective in softening up the target area. Supported by heavy machine guns from the 7th Machine Gun Battalion, and two mountain guns from the 1st Mountain Battery, the attack began with a platoon-level feint up the main track, while a second moved along a side track in effort to find the rear of the Japanese defensive position to attack. From the beginning the attack went against the Australians with the feint attack being pinned down and the flanking platoon being hit by heavy machine gun fire from a previously unidentified Japanese position north of the Pimple. The Australians lost six killed and eight wounded on the first day. The following day, the attack continued with further losses of three men wounded. The Japanese sent 60 reinforcements to the Pimple and after a brief clash in which five Japanese were killed and five wounded, the Australians pulled back. Attempts were made to reduce the Japanese defences over the following days, before a second abortive was made on 2 May with air support and artillery barrages from several mountain guns. Once again it was turned back. On 7 May, an attempt to flank the position with two platoons was also turned back.

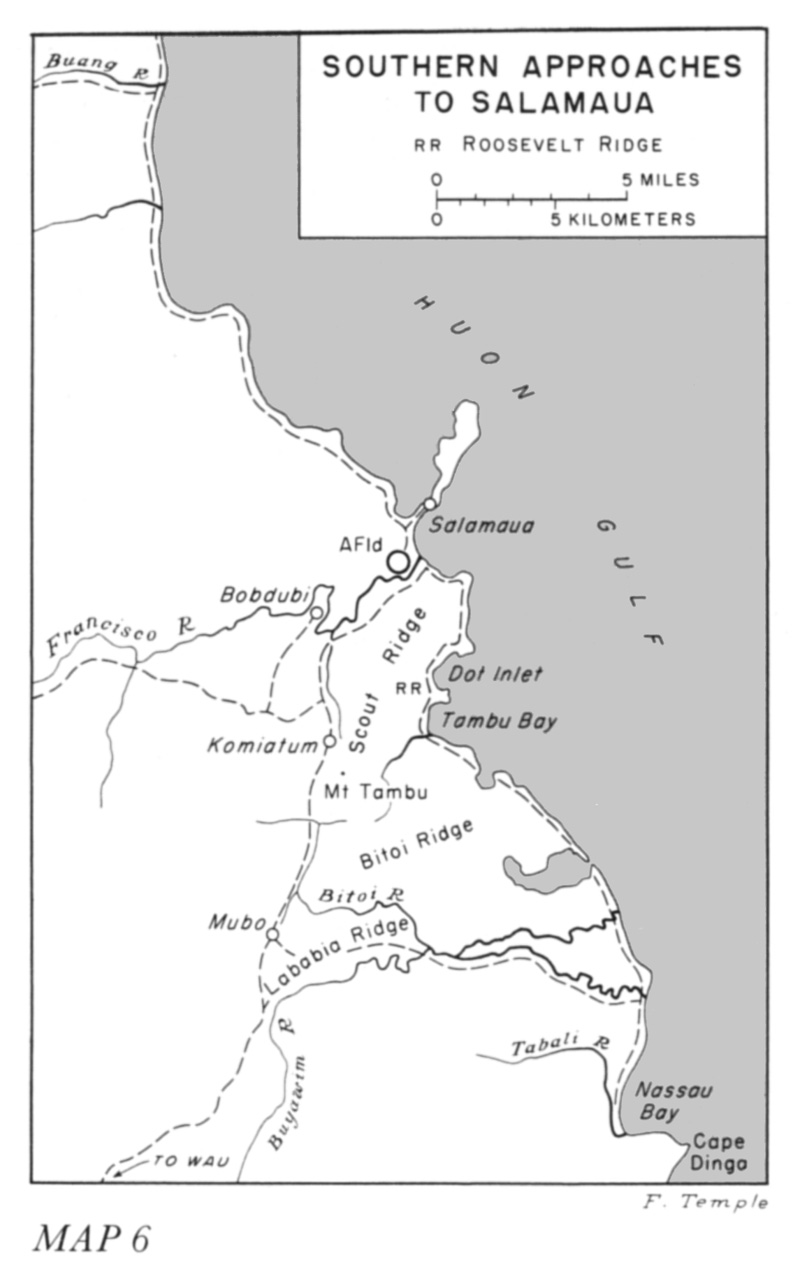
Map showing key locations in the Salamaua-Lae region

On 9 May the Japanese launched a counter-attack on one of the 2/7th's companies that was positioned to the north of the Australian main defensive position. Under the command of Captain Leslie Tatterson, the Australian company fought a desperate defensive action as they were isolated and heavily assaulted. Over the course of several days, about 500 Japanese troops from the 102nd and 115th Infantry Regiments – part of Hidemitsu Nakano's 51st Division – launched eight attacks on the position, until finally a group of 60 reinforcements were able to break through to them on 11 May. The attack resulted in 12 Australian and 100 Japanese casualties.

Fighting continued in the area into July. Following the initial assault on the Australian company, the Japanese had brought in reinforcements and now numbered about 600 men, which were mainly drawn from the 66th Infantry Regiment. The Allied forces in the area attempted to reduce the Japanese positions with heavy artillery and air bombardment, and had begun employing indirect tactics to infiltrate the Japanese outposts. From 4 July, the Allied pressure in the area intensified, as a joint Australian and US advance began clearing the Japanese positions from along the Bitoi River and resulted in 950 Japanese killed. Attacks around Bobdubi and Nassau Bay allowed US and Australian forces to link up, while the 1st Battalion, 162nd Infantry Regiment, under Lieutenant Colonel Harold Taylor, having just landed at Nassau Bay, was tasked with occupying the Bitoi Ridge on 5 July, in an effort to force the Japanese to withdraw from Mubo through indirect means. The US soldiers were delayed in moving inland following the landing, and although the battalion's lead company subsequently succeeded in securing the southern part of the ridge, and had occupied the crest, nevertheless, the Japanese force remained around Mubo.

As a result, the Allied commanders were forced to pursue more direct means of taking Mubo, and consequently the 17th Brigade was forced to put in a further assault on Mubo. For the attack, the 2/6th Infantry Battalion pushed forward from Wau, and provided two companies – 'A' and 'B' – to the initial phase, attacking Observation Hill along with the 2/5th Infantry Battalion's 'C' Company. Commencing on 7 July, the attack on Observation Hill was followed up by actions around several other features, including the Pimple and Green Hill, and by 12 July the Japanese were forced to withdraw from the area. This allowed the town of Mubo to be secured. In order to cut off the retreating Japanese, a company of Australians from the 2/6th was dispatched to join up with a US force in an effort to establish a blocking position; arriving on the night of 12/13 July, they arrived too late, and consequently the Japanese were able to move back to Mount Tambu, where they established themselves in strong entrenchments. Early in the final phase, the Japanese divisional commander, Nakano, had determined to concentrate his forces in the Komiatum area – an area of high ground to the south of Salamaua – and he had subsequently passed the order for the withdrawal of his troops around Mubo on 10 July.

== Aftermath ==
In the aftermath of the fighting around Mubo, fighting in the Salamaua area continued. With the Allies making ground closer to Salamaua, the Japanese withdrew to avoid encirclement. To the Allied planners, Salamaua itself was not considered important, but they hoped that maintaining pressure on the Japanese in the area would serve to draw reinforcements away from Lae, where a seaborne landing was planned for mid-September in conjunction with an airborne landing at Nadzab as part of a wider pincer movement to capture Lae itself. Thus, further actions were fought throughout July and August around Roosevelt Ridge, Komiatum and Mount Tambu, prior to the final capture of Salamaua on 11 September following advances by the Australian 15th and 29th Brigades, and the US 162nd Infantry Regiment.

Two battle honours were awarded by the Australian Army for actions around Mubo: "Mubo I" to the 2/7th for actions between 22 April and 29 May, and "Mubo II" to the 2/5th and 2/6th Infantry Battalions for the capture of the village itself between 7 and 14 July 1943.
