= 17th Brigade (Australia) =

Infantry brigade of the Australian Army 1917-1946

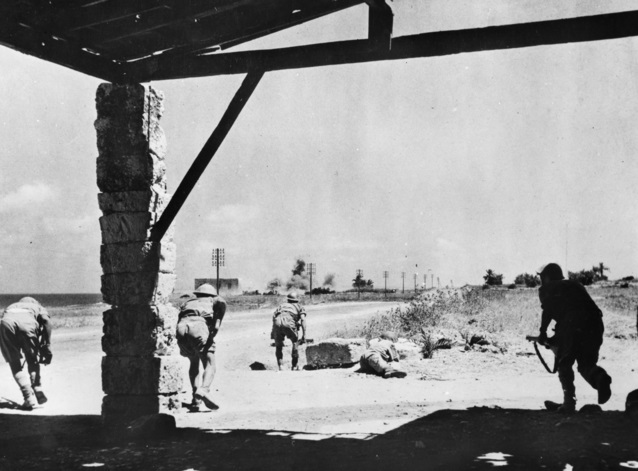
- 2/5th Battalion troops in action around Khalde, in Syria, July 1941
- Active: 1917; 1939–1946
- Country: Australia
- Branch: Australian Army
- Type: Infantry
- Size: Brigade
- Part of: 6th Division
- Engagements: World War I World War II: Western Desert campaign; Battle of Greece; Battle of Crete; Syria–Lebanon campaign; Battle of Wau; Aitape–Wewak campaign

Insignia
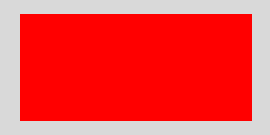
- Headquarters unit colour patch

The 17th Brigade was an infantry brigade in the Australian Army. First raised in 1912 as a Militia formation to provide training under the compulsory training scheme, the brigade was later re-raised as part of the First Australian Imperial Force during World War I. Established in 1917 in the United Kingdom, it was broken up and disbanded without seeing action, and its personnel used as reinforcements for other formations. Reformed during World War II, it took part in fighting in Libya, Greece, Crete, Syria in 1941–1942. Following Japan's entry into the war, the Australian government pressed for the 6th Division's return, and the 17th Brigade was subsequently brought back from the Middle East, via Ceylon where they undertook defensive duties until July 1942. Following the brigade's return to Australia, it was deployed to New Guinea for two campaigns: the Salamaua–Lae campaign in 1943 and the Aitape–Wewak campaign in 1944–1945. After the war, the brigade was disbanded in January 1946. Today, its name is perpetuated by the 17th Sustainment Brigade, which was raised as a logistics formation in May 2006.

== History ==
=== Pre-war years ===
In 1912, when Australian introduced the compulsory training scheme, a total of 23 Militia brigades, mostly of four battalions, were planned for. These were assigned to six military districts around Australia. At this time, the 17th Brigade formed part of the 3rd Military District. The brigade's constituent units had training depots in various locations around Victoria, including Footscray, Castlemaine, Kyneton, Bendigo, and Echuca. The brigade's constituent battalions were sequentially numbered: 65th, 66th, 67th and 68th.

=== World War I ===
During World War I, the 17th Brigade was formed as part of the all volunteer First Australian Imperial Force (AIF) in England, in the Salisbury Plain Training Area, as part of the 6th Division on 25 April 1917. The brigade consisted of four infantry battalions, and supported by a machine gun company and a light trench mortar battery. By September 1917, the brigade's strength was just over 3,000 men. Heavy casualties amongst Australian forces on the Western Front at Bullecourt and Messines throughout 1917 resulted in a manpower shortage amongst the five divisions of the AIF. As a result, plans to raise the 6th Division were shelved and its constituent formations were disbanded without seeing any action. The brigade's personnel were then used as reinforcements. The brigade's machine gun company was later re-designated as the 24th Machine Gun Company and eventually allocated to the 4th Machine Gun Battalion, going to serve as part of the 4th Division. Only 15 infantry brigades were raised as part of the Militia during the interwar years, so the 17th Brigade was not re-raised during this time.

=== World War II ===
Following the outbreak of World War II, the 17th Brigade was reformed as part of the all volunteer Second Australian Imperial Force (2nd AIF). Once again it formed part of the 6th Division. Its headquarters was raised at the Melbourne Showgrounds on 13 October 1939, and upon formation it consisted of four infantry battalions – 2/5th, 2/6th, 2/7th and 2/8th – all of which were recruited from Victoria. Basic training was undertaken at Puckapunyal, after which the brigade embarked for overseas, under the command of Brigadier Stanley Savige. They arrived in the Middle East in April 1940 and by May were stationed in Palestine. That month, the 2/8th Infantry Battalion was transferred to the 19th Brigade, as the 2nd AIF adopted the triangular brigade structure that was standard in the British Army. Further training was carried out in Egypt, at Helway, in September, at which point the 17th Brigade received the remainder of its war equipment. Divisional exercises were undertaken around Ikingi Maryut in October and November, during which the 16th and 17th Brigades practised assault techniques, while the 19th Brigade assumed a defensive role. After this, the 6th Division was deployed to Libya in preparation for their commitment to the Western Desert Campaign.

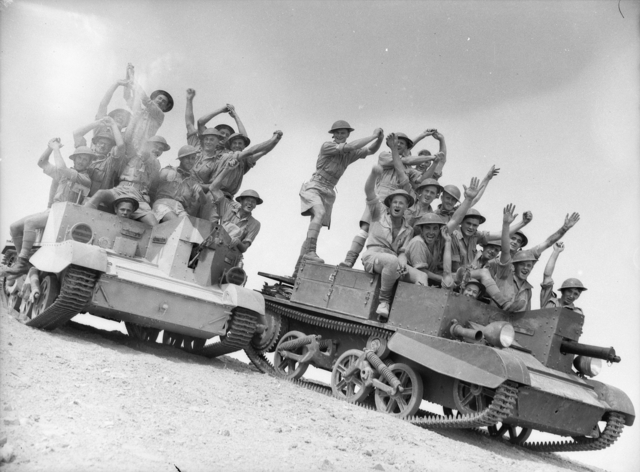
Soldiers from the 17th Brigade on Bren Carriers in Egypt, October 1940.

In January 1941, the Australians went into action for the first time around Bardia. While the 16th Brigade led the assault, the 17th Brigade was assigned a supporting role. The 2/7th Infantry Battalion provided the division's reserve element, while the 2/6th carried out an advance to the south of the fortress to divert the defenders' attention. Following the initial phase of the operation, the 2/5th and 2/7th then pushed through the gap created by the 16th Brigade and advanced south-easterly against the Italian defences. The brigade struggled to make progress during this phase, though, and had to be reinforced by the 2/11th Infantry Battalion from the 19th Brigade. This was followed by the capture of Tobruk, during which the 17th Brigade was again allocated a secondary role, providing reinforcements to the assaulting brigades. In the aftermath, the Italians began to fall back towards Tripoli. The 17th Brigade was pushed forward in pursuit, with the 2/7th Infantry Battalion capturing Barce and then Marsa Brega before the 20th Brigade arrived to relieve them, as part of preparations to redeploy the 6th Division to Greece in response to promises to defend the country against an expected German invasion. The brigade subsequently concentrated around Amiriya, in Egypt.

The 6th Division deployed in stages, with the 16th deploying first, followed by the 19th. The 17th arrived in mid-April, disembarking at Piraeus along with the 2/11th Infantry Battalion, which had not deployed with the rest of the 19th Brigade. They arrived as the German invasion was in full swing and upon their arrival the troops were loaded into trucks and driven to the front line around Larissa with orders to form a blocking position. While the 2/6th and 2/7th Infantry Battalions established rearguard positions around Domokos, the brigade's headquarters formed an ad hoc formation consisting of the 2/5th and 2/11th Infantry Battalions and took up positions on the Grevena–Kalabaka road. As the German advance pushed the Allies back, the brigade was pushed south in a series of withdrawals until they were ordered to evacuate from Kalamata in late April.

While the majority of the brigade was evacuated back to Palestine, in the confusion the 2/7th was sent to Crete while several hundred men from the 2/5th and 2/6th were also landed after their troopship, the Costa Rica, was sunk en route to Alexandria. The 2/7th was attached to the 19th Brigade at this time, while the two smaller battalions formed a 17th Brigade Composite Battalion, which was assigned to Cremor Force. Cremor Force assumed defensive positions around the western end of the island, with the 17th Brigade Composite Battalion located around Suda Point, while the 2/7th defended Georgiopolis. On 20 May, the Germans launched an invasion of Crete, after which there was heavy fighting on the island as the British, Greek, New Zealand, and Australian defenders fought to repel the airborne assault. Despite inflicting heavy casualties, the Allies lost control of the airfield around Malame and were eventually pushed back towards Sfakia, from where only part of the garrison could be evacuated. During the fighting on Crete, the 2/7th's most significant action came during the Battle of 42nd Street, when they took part in a bayonet assault alongside the Maori Battalion, inflicting heavy casualties on a battalion of the 141st Gebirgsjager Regiment. After three days of rearguard fighting in the hills, plans were made to evacuate the 2/7th Battalion as the final combat unit to be withdrawn from the island, but heavy naval losses resulted in the attempt being cancelled. Although some personnel managed to make their own way back to Allied lines, or escaped later, over 400 personnel from the 2/7th were taken prisoner, while the 17th Brigade Composite Battalion lost 198 men captured. In addition, there were around 100 battle casualties in both units.

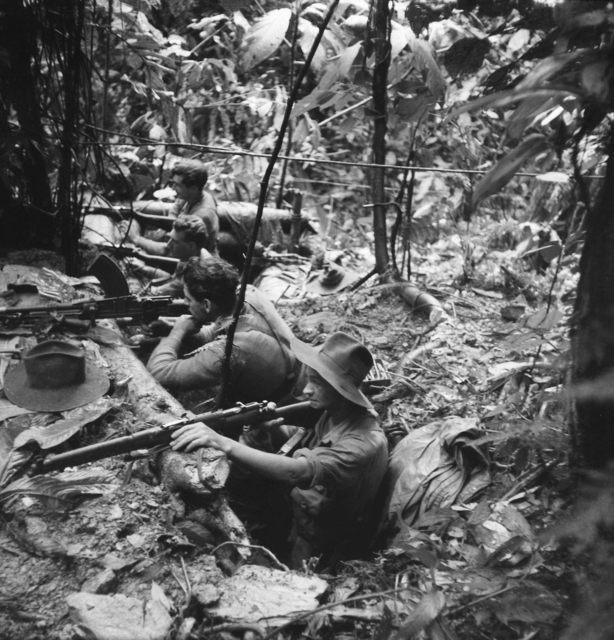
Members of the 2/5th Battalion man defensive positions in New Guinea, August 1943

Meanwhile, the rest of the brigade concentrated in Palestine in May 1941 and was re-formed. The 2/5th Infantry Battalion was detached in June to take part in the Syria–Lebanon campaign, attached to the 7th Division. Later in the campaign, the 17th Brigade's headquarters was also committed to the fighting, assuming control of the 2/3rd and 2/5th Infantry Battalions, and the 2/2nd Pioneers during the Battle of Damour, and then the advance towards Beirut. An armistice ended the conflict in mid-July, after which the brigade was assigned to occupation duties, providing a garrison along the Turkish border around Latakia and then later around Tripoli, in Lebanon. In November, the brigade was reconstituted with its original units, and the following month Brigadier Murray Moten took over command of the brigade. In early in 1942 returned to Palestine. With Japan's entry into the war, the Australian government requested the return of the 6th and 7th Divisions to help meet the new threat. However, the 16th and 17th Brigades were diverted en route to Ceylon where they undertook defensive duties amidst concerns of a Japanese invasion. The 17th Brigade was stationed around Akuressa during this time, before completing the voyage back to Australia in July 1942.

After their return to Australia, a period of leave followed. After this, the brigade was re-constituted at Seymour, Victoria, in August 1942, before moving to Singleton, New South Wales a month later. The situation in New Guinea improved for the Allies as the Japanese advance towards Port Moresby along the Kokoda Track was halted following their defeat at the Battle of Milne Bay and following a reversal on Guadalcanal. The 17th Brigade was subsequently deployed to Milne Bay in October 1942, freeing up the 18th Brigade to be deployed to northern Papua, to taking part in the fighting in the Buna–Gona area. As the Japanese began to shift their attention towards the capture of Wau, in January 1943 the 17th Brigade was relieved by the 29th Brigade and was redeployed to Port Moresby by sea, from where it was flown to Wau to reinforce Kanga Force, with Moten assuming command of Kanga Force. The move was delayed by bad weather and was not completed until late January, and aircraft bringing in reinforcements arrived under fire. Fighting commenced east of Wau on 28 January, when elements of the 2/6th Infantry Battalion, which had established an outpost, came under attack. This was followed two days later by the main attack on the airfield, which was held by the 2/5th and 2/7th Infantry Battalions. Several days of heavy fighting followed, and Wau came under air attack on 6 February; however, by 9 February the Australians had cleared the Japanese from the area, forcing them to withdraw. In the following months, elements of the 17th Brigade took part in several actions around Mubo, Bobdubi, Lababia Ridge, Nassau Bay, and Mount Tambu. As the Australians advanced on Salamaua, the 2/7th was detached to support the 15th Infantry Brigade.

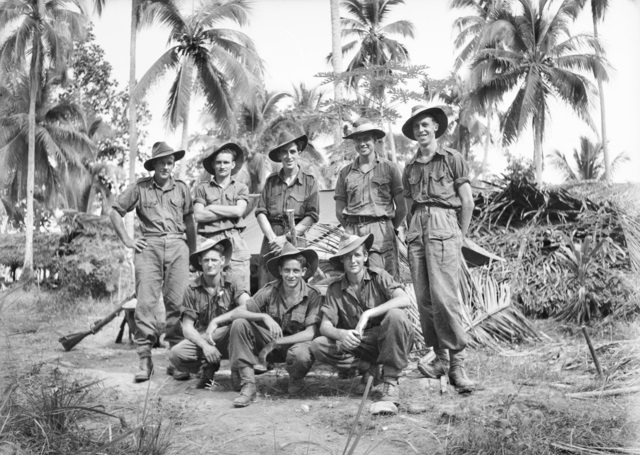
A 2/7th Battalion patrol, New Guinea, 17 August 1945

Following the capture of Salamaua, the 17th Brigade embarked from Nassau Bay and returned to Australia, concentrating at Wondecla, Queensland, where the 6th Division was reunited on the Atherton Tablelands. A long period of training followed for the 17th Brigade as the role of Australian troops in the Pacific was largely taken over by the US, leaving the 6th Division without a role for a considerable period. Finally, in late 1944, it was determined that Australian forces would relieve US troops around Aitape, in order to free them up for redeployment to the Philippines. US troops had secured an airfield at Aitape, and established a strong base there; Australian troops were expected to hold this base and then push patrols east along the coast towards Wewak, while limiting offensive actions so as not to result in the need for the commitment of large scale forces. The brigade began arriving at the US-held airfield at Aitape in November and while the 16th and 19th Brigades carried the advance along the coast, the 17th pushed up the Sepik River inland from the Torricelli Range, rotating each battalion between defensive and offensive actions. In January 1945, the 2/5th moved towards Perimbul and Balif, while the following month the remainder of the brigade advanced to Ami, linking up with the 2/5th around Maprik. The 2/7th took over the advance in February, while flanking units from Hay Force pushed the Japanese into their path. The 2/6th took over from the commandos at Ami in March and the 2/5th took over from the 2/7th in June. Around this time, the 2nd New Guinea Infantry Battalion was assigned to the 17th Brigade and undertook patrols between Hayfield and Gwalip, before the 2/7th took over. In July, they pushed towards Kiarivu, as the Australian advance moved into the mountain areas. The war ended shortly after this, in mid-August, by which time the brigade's four battalions were in action against the Japanese around Mount Irup.

Following the conclusion of hostilities, by mid-October the 17th Brigade concentrated around Dallman Harbour. The demobilisation process began shortly after the war ended, with drafts of personnel being returned to Australia based on priority. A series of cross postings also occurred at this time, with 17th Brigade units swapping personnel with units from the 8th Brigade. Meanwhile, personnel undertook parades and occupation duties, overseeing the surrender of Japanese personnel. There was a shortage of shipping at the time, so the process of demobilisation was slow. The troops were kept occupied with other activities including vocational education and training, and sports. From November, Moten relinquished command of the brigade, taking over the 6th Division, while a series of administrative commanders temporarily took over the brigade. Cross postings came to an end in December, and that month the main body of the brigade began moving to Australia, with troops from the 2/5th embarking upon the troopship Duntroon, and cadres from other units embarking upon the British aircraft carrier, Implacable, departing Wewak on 14 December 1945. After arriving at Woolloomooloo, the brigade concentrated at Wallgrove, New South Wales, before a period of leave. In January 1946, at Puckapunyal, most of the brigade's personnel were demobilised while a small cadre remained to complete the administration necessary for the brigade to be disbanded.

In the post war era, the 17th Brigade was not re-raised. Its numerical designation is perpetuated, though, by a logistics formation, the 17th Sustainment Brigade, which was raised on 20 May 2006 as the 17th Combat Service Support Brigade.

== Units ==
During World War I, the brigade consisted of the following units:

- 62nd Battalion (25 April 1917 – 16 May 1917)
- 63rd Battalion (25 April 1917 – 16 May 1917)
- 65th Battalion (17 May 1917 – 16 September 1917)
- 66th Battalion (25 April 1917 – 16 September 1917)
- 67th Battalion (25 April 1917 – 16 September 1917)
- 70th Battalion (17 May 1917 – 16 September 1917)
- 17th Machine Gun Company (1 June 1917 – 20 August 1917)
- 17th Light Trench Mortar Battery (28 May 1917 – 16 September 1917)

During World War II, the brigade consisted of the following units:

- 2/5th Battalion (18 October 1939 – 28 February 1946)
- 2/6th Battalion (25 October 1939 – 18 February 1946)
- 2/7th Battalion (25 October 1939 – February 1946)
- 2/8th Battalion (30 October 1939 – May 1940) to 19th Brigade

== Commanders ==
The following officers commanded the brigade during World War I:

- Brigadier General John Paton (25 April 1917 – 19 July 1917)
- Colonel William Watson (19 July 1917 – 26 September 1917)

The following officers commanded the brigade during World War II:

- Brigadier Stanley Savige (13 October 1939 – 15 December 1941)
- Brigadier Murray Moten (17 December 1941 – November 1945)
