= Hugh Wrigley =

Australian senior officer

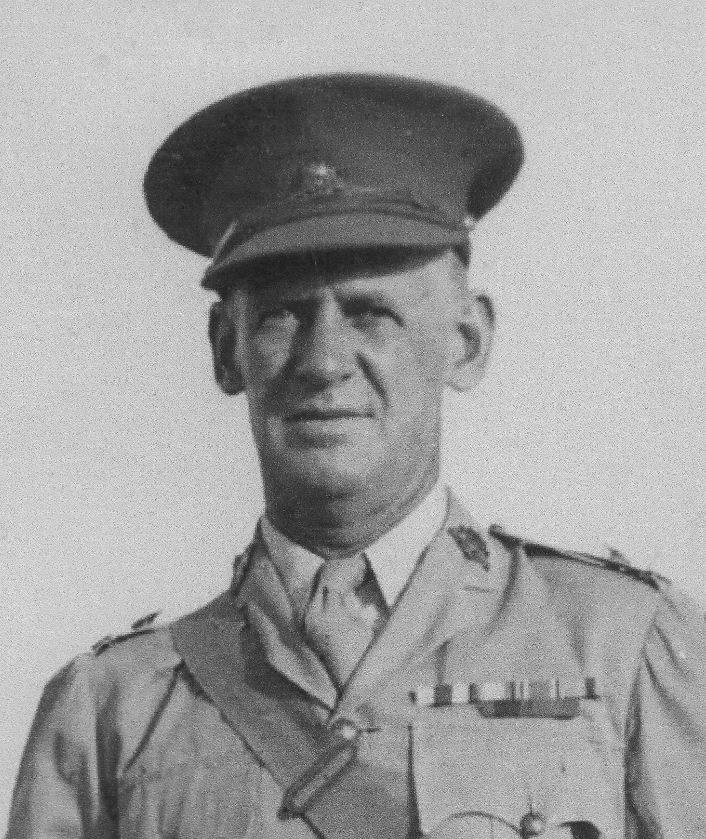
- Wrigley in 1940
- Born: 1 December 1891; Scarsdale, Victoria
- Died: 3 June 1980 (aged 88); Caringbah, New South Wales
- Military career
- Allegiance: Australia
- Branch: Australian Army; British Indian Army
- Service years: 1914–1922; 1933–1936; 1939–1946
- Rank: Brigadier
- Service number: VX171
- Commands: 33rd Brigade (1945–46); 3rd Australian Prisoner of War Reception Group (1945); 1st Australian Base Sub-Area (1944–45); 2nd Australian Base Sub-Area (1944); 20th Brigade (1942); 2/6th Battalion (1941–42); 2/5th Battalion (1940–41)
- Conflicts: First World War; Gallipoli Campaign; Western Front; Third Anglo–Afghan War; Second World War; North African campaign
- Awards: Commander of the Order of the British Empire; Military Cross; Efficiency Decoration; Mentioned in Despatches

Brigadier Hugh Wrigley, CBE, MC, ED (1 December 1891 – 3 June 1980) was a senior officer of the Australian Army who served in the First and Second World Wars. He also served with the Indian Army between 1917 and 1922. After returning to Australia in 1922, Wrigley worked as an oil company representative in New South Wales and Victoria and served in the Citizens Military Force. During the Second World War he volunteered for overseas service and fought in Greece, where he commanded the 2/6th Battalion. In North Africa, Wrigley commanded the 20th Brigade, leading them during the Second Battle of El Alamein. Later in the war he commanded the 33rd Brigade in the Netherlands East Indies where he took responsibility for overseeing the repatriation of a large number of Australian and British personnel. After the war, Wrigley worked as a public servant in the area of trade and commerce, serving in a number of overseas posts. He died in 1980 at the age of 88.

== Early life ==
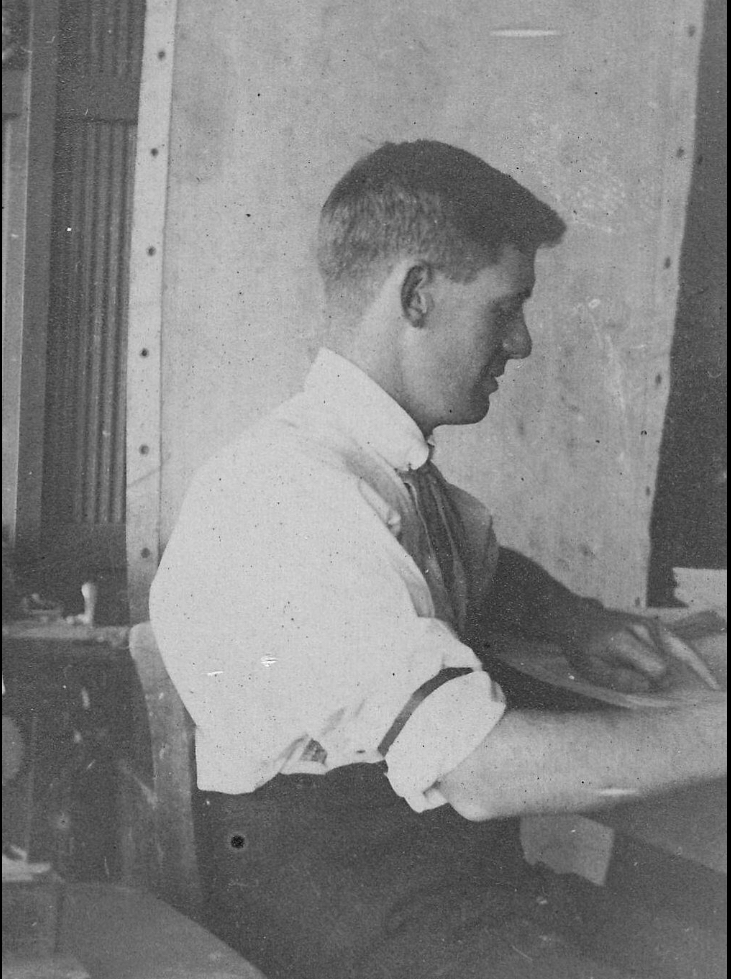
Hugh Wrigley at work as a defence clerk in Melbourne in 1912

Wrigley was born on 1 December 1891 at Scarsdale, Victoria, the sixth and youngest child of John Wrigley and Isabella, née McGeachin. He was educated at a number of public and private schools. After completing his education he gained employment as a military staff clerk at the Department of Defence in Melbourne in May 1911.

== First World War ==
Following the outbreak of the First World War in the summer of 1914, Wrigley volunteered for overseas service and enlisted in the Australian Imperial Force on 17 August 1914. Granted the rank of staff sergeant, he was allocated to 3rd Brigade headquarters. Arriving at Gallipoli in April 1915 on board HMS Colne, he was made temporary warrant officer in October. He was evacuated from the Gallipoli peninsula in December 1915 following the Allied evacuation and returned to Egypt. For his service at Gallipoli he received a Mentioned in Despatches and on 20 February 1916 he was commissioned as a second lieutenant and posted to the 59th Battalion. In June 1916 he was promoted to lieutenant prior to deployment to France and posted to the 60th Battalion as adjutant. He was severely wounded on 19 July during the Battle of Fromelles while leading an attack against enemy trenches, for which he was later awarded the Military Cross. After spending two months in hospital in England, he was promoted to captain in November. He rejoined the 60th Battalion in January 1917 and resumed duties as adjutant in May. In April 1918, he lost his elder brother, Lance Corporal Fred R Wrigley, who was killed in action in France.

== Indian Army ==
Transferring to the Indian Army in July 1917, he was appointed as a second lieutenant, although was later promoted to captain. He was initially posted to the 2nd Battalion, 123rd Outram's Rifles and served with them until 1921 when he was transferred to the 1st Battalion, 125th Napier's Rifles. In 1922, these two regiments were amalgamated to form the 6th Rajputana Rifles. While serving in the Indian Army Wrigley participated in the campaigns in Afghanistan during the Third Anglo-Afghan War in 1919, Iraq during the Iraqi revolt against the British between 1920 and 1921 and in Waziristan in 1922. He returned to Australia later in 1922.

== Between the wars ==
Wrigley purchased a grazing property at Balmoral, Victoria, together with some Indian Army friends. He married Alison Grove Wilson on 8 January 1926 at Gardiner, Melbourne. They had a son before being divorcing. Moving to Urangeline, New South Wales, he gained employment with Vacuum Oil Co. Pty Ltd in 1930 and worked at Hay and later at Sale, Victoria.

Between 1933 and 1936, Wrigley was an active member of the Citizens Military Force. Following a break in service, he rejoined again in March 1939.

== Second World War ==
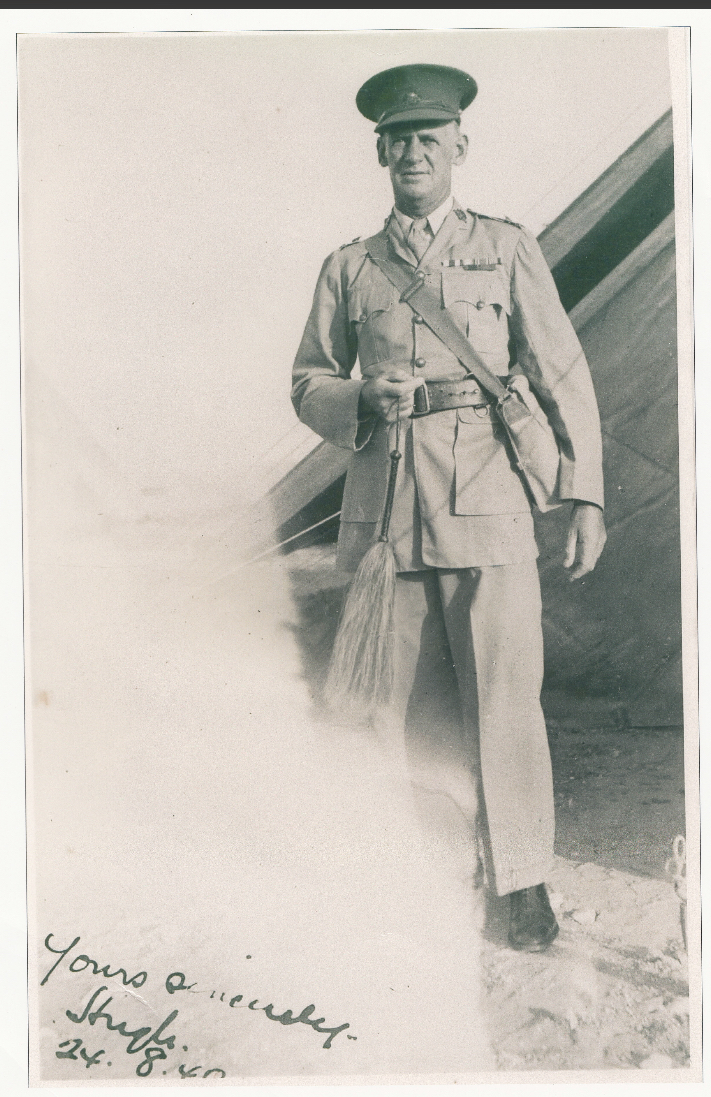
Lieutenant Colonel Hugh Wrigley, Egypt, April 1940

Following the outbreak of the Second World War, Wrigley volunteered for overseas service and enlisted in the Second Australian Imperial Force. Holding the rank of major, in October 1939 he was posted to the 2/6th Battalion as the unit's second-in-command. Sailing for the Middle East in April 1940, he was promoted to lieutenant colonel in December and placed in command of the 2/5th Battalion. While fighting at Bardia, Libya, he was wounded by shell-fire in the shoulder on 3 January 1941. After a period of convalescence in hospital, he rejoined the 2/6th Battalion in March as commanding officer and led it in the Greek campaign in April.

Promoted to colonel in January 1942, Wrigley was posted as the officer in charge Australian Imperial Force Reinforcement Depot in Palestine in February. He was later promoted to temporary brigadier on 28 September, and placed in command of the 20th Brigade at the Second Battle of El Alamein, Egypt. Relinquishing his acting rank, he resumed his post at the reinforcement depot on 27 October. He was Mentioned in Despatches and appointed a Commander of the Order of the British Empire in 1943.

Returning to Australia in February 1943, Wrigley was commandant of various training depots and bases as a temporary brigadier. Appointed to the command of the 1st Base Sub-Area in September 1944, he travelled with the unit to Morotai, Netherlands East Indies in March 1945. Following the surrender of the Japanese in August, he was appointed in command of the 3rd Australian Prisoner of War Reception Group located in Manila and helped the return home of over 12,000 British and 3,000 Australian personnel. He was given command of the 33rd Brigade on Ambon, Netherlands East Indies from November until February 1946 when he returned to Australia and was transferred to the Reserve of Officers on 30 April.

== Later life ==
Wrigley was appointed to a position in the Department of Commerce and Agriculture in November 1946 and later as a commercial counsellor at the Australian mission in Japan. He was the trade commissioner in Hong Kong and the Philippines between 1949 and 1952, Bombay, India between 1953 and 1955, and Vancouver, Canada between 1955 and 1957.

After retiring from the Department of Commerce and Agriculture, Wrigley became a company director and bought property at Bringelly and Wagga Wagga, with his son. He married widower Jean Stewart, née Pirrit, at Burleigh Heads, Queensland on 18 September 1968.

Wrigley died on 3 June 1980 at Caringbah, Sydney, and was cremated. He was survived by his wife and the son of his first marriage.

A portrait painted by W. H. Parry of Wrigley was submitted for the 1944 Archibald prize.
