= 2/5th Battalion =

Former battalion of the Australian Army

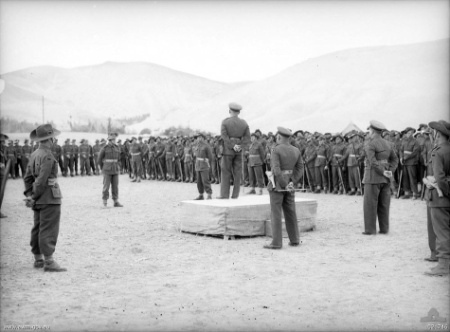
- 2/5th Battalion being addressed by Major General Edmund Herring in Syria, November 1941
- Active: 1939–1946
- Country: Australia
- Branch: Australian Army
- Type: Infantry
- Size: ~800–900 men (Note: By the start of World War II, the authorised strength of an Australian infantry battalion was 910 men all ranks; later in the war it fell to 803 after the Army adopted the jungle divisional establishment.)
- Part of: 17th Brigade, 6th Division
- Colours: Black over red
- Engagements: World War II: North African campaign; Battle of Greece; Battle of Crete; Syrian campaign; New Guinea campaign; Salamaua–Lae campaign; Aitape–Wewak campaign

Insignia
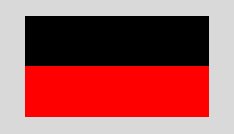
- Unit colour patch

The 2/5th Battalion was an infantry battalion of the Australian Army that operated during World War II. It was raised at Melbourne, Victoria, on 18 October 1939 as part of the Second Australian Imperial Force (2nd AIF), attached to the 17th Brigade of the 6th Division. The 2/5th was one of only two Australian infantry battalions to fight against all of the major Axis powers during the war, seeing action against the Germans and Italians in Egypt, Libya, Greece and Crete, and the Vichy French in Syria, before returning to Australia in 1942 to fight the Japanese following a period of garrison duties in Ceylon, where it formed part of an Australian force established to defend against a possible Japanese invasion.

Following its return to Australia, the battalion was re-organised for jungle warfare and took part in two campaigns in New Guinea. The first of these campaigns came in 1942–1943 when it was involved in the defence of Wau and the Salamaua–Lae campaign, and then again in 1944–1945 when it took part in the Aitape–Wewak campaign. Following the end of the war, the battalion embarked for Australia on 1 December 1945 and disbanded at Puckapunyal in early February 1946. Its battle honours are maintained by the 5th/6th Battalion, Royal Victoria Regiment.

== History ==
=== Formation and training 1940–1941 ===
Following the outbreak of World War II on 3 September 1939, the Australian government announced the decision to raise the all-volunteer Second Australian Imperial Force (2nd AIF), since the Defence Act precluded sending Australia's part-time military forces overseas. As part of the force, the 2/5th Battalion (Note: The numerical designation of 2nd AIF units was prefixed by "2/", which was used to set them apart from Militia units with corresponding numerical designations.) was raised in Melbourne, Victoria, on 18 October 1939 and began to receive its first intake of men on 2 November 1939 when it moved to Puckapunyal. Many of the battalion's initial recruits came from the Victorian Scottish Regiment, a Militia unit associated with the 5th Battalion, which had been raised as part of the First Australian Imperial Force during World War I. The battalion's first commanding officer was Lieutenant Colonel Thomas Cook, although he was replaced as commander by Major Hugh Wrigley before the battalion went into combat, as Cook was considered too old to lead troops in combat.

Along with the 2/6th, 2/7th and 2/8th Battalions, the 2/5th formed the 17th Brigade, and was assigned to the 6th Division, the first infantry division formed as part of the 2nd AIF. The colours chosen for the battalion's unit colour patch (UCP) were the same as those of the 5th Battalion. These colours were black over red, in a horizontal rectangular shape, although a border of grey was added to the UCP to distinguish the battalion from its Militia counterpart. With an authorised strength of around 900 personnel, like other Australian infantry battalions of the time, the battalion consisted of four rifle companies, from 'A' to 'D', each consisting of three platoons. These companies were supported by a battalion headquarters and a headquarters company with six specialist platoons: signals, pioneer, anti-aircraft, transport, administrative and mortars. The battalion also had a regimental aid post attached. The battalion's personnel assembled between November 1939 and April 1940, undertaking basic training in Australia before embarking for the Middle East on 14 April 1940 aboard the transport HMT Ettrick from Port Melbourne.

=== North Africa, Greece and Syria 1941–1942 ===
The battalion arrived in Egypt on 18 May 1940, and joined the 17th Brigade's other two infantry battalions in camp at Beit Jirja. A further period of training in Palestine followed before the battalion took part in the fighting against the Italians in Libya in January–February 1941, during which the 2/5th was involved in attacks on Bardia and Tobruk, as the Australians went into battle for the first time. During the fighting around Bardia, the battalion's commander, Wrigley, was seriously wounded in an artillery bombardment, and was temporarily replaced by Major George Sell, as the battalion was committed to the fighting in the second phase of the assault, advancing through the bridgehead that had been established towards the railway switchline. Later, during the assault on Tobruk, the 2/5th was tasked with conducting a diversionary attack to the east of the Italian perimeter. The battalion's time in Libya cost it 32 killed, and 60 wounded.

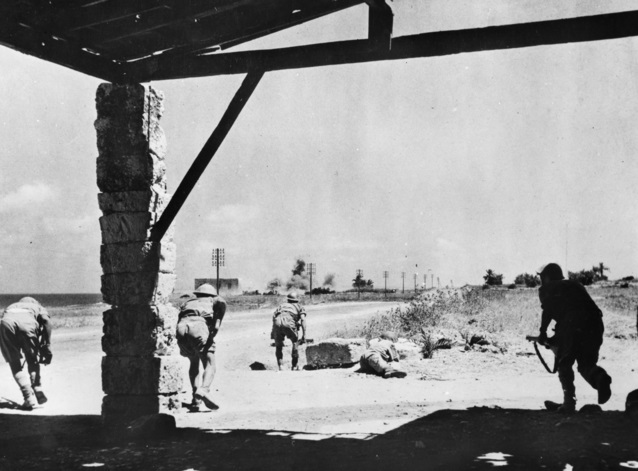
2/5th Battalion troops in action around Khalde, July 1941

A few months later in April the 6th Division was sent to Greece in order to defend against a possible German invasion of that nation. The invasion took place as anticipated, although in the end the British and Commonwealth forces were unable to stem the tide of the German onslaught. The 2/5th Battalion began the campaign at Kalambaka on 14 April. In a series of withdrawals made necessary by the lightning advance of German forces, it was pushed back all the way to the port of Kalamata, where it was evacuated a couple of weeks later on 27 April 1941. The battalion lost 21 men killed, 26 wounded and 47 as prisoners of war; (Note: These figures differ from Johnston who provides 18 killed in action, two died of wounds, 28 wounded, and 55 captured.) most of the prisoners were drivers who were captured having been unable to make it out in time. The majority of the battalion, consisting of 560 personnel, was evacuated to Alexandria, and from there concentrated in Palestine; a few – 74 men – in the confusion of the evacuation were landed on Crete, where they formed a composite battalion along with other 17th Brigade units and personnel, including about 260 personnel from the 2/6th Battalion. These personnel were assigned to Cremor Force in the Suda Sector, and occupied a position around Kalami. They then took part in the Battle of Crete following the German invasion on 20 May, during which the majority of the 2/5th personnel assigned to the composite battalion were captured. The battalion's casualties for the campaign amounted to three killed in action or died of wounds, three wounded and 58 captured. Six men from the battalion are known to have evaded capture during the fighting in Greece or Crete, although one of these was later killed in action while fighting alongside Yugoslav resistance forces. Those that were taken prisoner were eventually moved to camps in Germany or Poland until they were liberated at the end of the war.

In June–July 1941, the Australians were deployed to Syria and Lebanon for the campaign against the Vichy French, which was launched by the British in order to prevent the French-held colonies from being controlled by the Germans; the majority of the Australian forces were drawn from the 7th Division, although the 16th and 17th Brigades were called upon to provide reinforcements, detaching the 2/3rd and 2/5th Battalions. The 2/5th Battalion's initial involvement in the campaign came in mid-June during the French counterattack, when one of its companies went into action around Merdjayuon. After this, the battalion's main involvement came in early July, when it took part in the Battle of Damour, which proved to be the final battle of the campaign. After a preliminary move across the Damour River, during the final assault on Damour, the 2/5th Battalion, in concert with the 2/3rd, advanced from El Boum, moving through the 21st Brigade's position, to cut the road to the north of the Damour, while other forces advanced from the east. In the days following the capture of Damour, the 2/5th had continued the advance north towards Khalde on the coastal road to Beirut; meanwhile, the Vichy commanders sought an armistice, bringing the campaign to an end on 12 July. The 2/5th's casualties during the brief campaign amounted to 41 men killed or wounded. (Note: Johnston provides nine killed, five died of wounds, 28 wounded and two captured.) In the aftermath, the battalion remained in the Middle East, serving as an occupation force in Syria and Lebanon until January 1942. Following Japan's entry into the war, the Australian government requested the return of the battalion as it was needed for the fighting in New Guinea and elsewhere in the Pacific.

=== New Guinea 1942–1945 ===
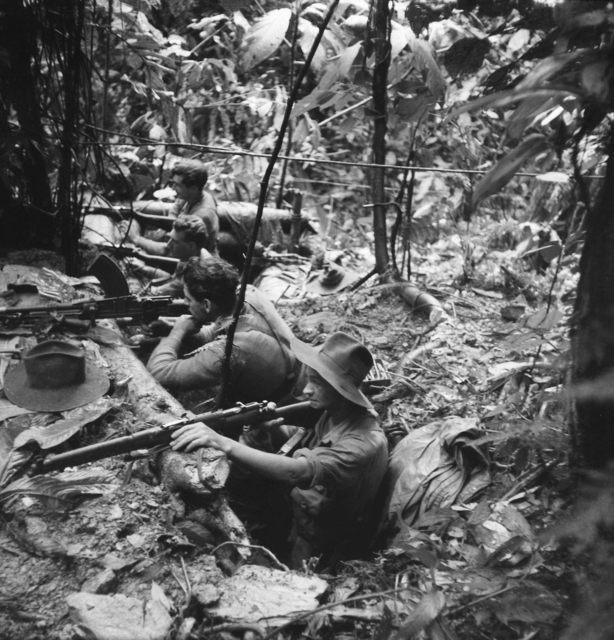
Members of the 2/5th Battalion man defensive positions in New Guinea, August 1943

The battalion departed the Middle East on 10 March 1942 aboard the troopship SS Otranto; however, on the voyage back to Australia the 16th and 17th Brigades were disembarked in Ceylon, due to fears of a Japanese attack. For nearly four months they were stationed on the island, initially in Galle, around the fort, and then later around the bay, where observation posts and section defensive positions were established. Throughout April and May, the 2/5th Battalion endured heavy rains but nevertheless undertook a series of exercises and training. In early July, the battalion finally received orders to return to Australia and, after being relieved at the Galle Fort by the 3rd Battalion, 8th Gurkhas, was transported to Colombo to embark upon the Athlone Castle. On 4 August 1942, the battalion arrived in Melbourne, having been away for over two years.

A short period of home leave followed, before the battalion's personnel concentrated at Royal Park for a march through Melbourne. A draft of reinforcements arrived around this time also, incorporating men from New South Wales and several others states. In mid-September, the battalion moved to Greta, New South Wales, travelling by rail through Shepparton, Tocumwal and Newcastle. A brief period of training was undertaken there, during which the battalion's khaki uniforms were dyed green. During this time, the battalion was re-organised and converted to the jungle establishment; as part of this process its authorised strength was reduced to around 800 personnel of all ranks. The situation in the Pacific had deteriorated dramatically, and the Australian forces holding out against the Japanese in New Guinea were hard-pressed and desperately in need of reinforcement. Thus in early October 1942, not more than two months after returning to Australia, the 2/5th moved to Brisbane, Queensland, where it deployed to Milne Bay, which had only recently been held in the face of a Japanese landing, aboard the Dutch transport Maetsuyker.

The battalion did not take part in any fighting until a few months later when, in January 1943, it took part in the defence of Wau after the 17th Brigade was despatched to reinforce Kanga Force. Sailing to Port Moresby from Milne Bay on the MV Duntroon, an advance party of two companies from the battalion was flown into Wau on 24 January to hastily reinforce the small force around Ballams. The remainder – totalling about 450 men – arriving on 29 January, after which they secured the airfield, which was now under direct Japanese fire, as the two companies that had arrived earlier were pulled back from Ballams. In early February, as the Australians gained the initiative, the battalion was relieved from holding the airfield, and went on the offensive, attacking alongside the 2/7th Battalion, in an effort to push the Japanese away from their positions on the bank of the Bulolo River, around Crystal Creek, to the south-west of Wau. The fighting was intense, and over the course of three days, the battalion lost 27 killed and 31 wounded.

After Wau was secured, the battalion undertook patrolling operations around Mubo, along with the rest of Kanga Force, before joining the advance on Salamaua in support of the 3rd Division, with a view to drawing Japanese reinforcements away from Lae, where a landing was planned for September. The Japanese put up a strong resistance and the battalion became involved in heavy fighting around Mubo in May, before fighting at Goodview Junction and Mount Tambu in July and August as part of actions to secure Komiatum; around Goodview, two companies were deployed in a holding action and to attempt to outflank Mount Tambu to cut the Japanese line of communication, while the other two companies attacked Mount Tambu itself. Casualties for the battalion between April and September amounted to 34 killed and 95 wounded. As the 5th Division arrived to take over from the 3rd following the capture of Mount Tambu and the link up with US forces, the 2/5th Battalion was withdrawn from the line, concentrating around Nassau Bay in late August as the 17th Brigade was relieved by the 29th. After a fortnight of unloading ships around the bay, the battalion was moved by landing craft to Milne Bay, where it embarked on the Liberty ship Charles Steinmetz and the Dutch transport Boschfontein. (Note: Trigellis–Smith identifies this ship as the Barsfontein.) On 23 September 1943, the battalion arrived back in Australia, landing at Cairns, Queensland. The fighting in the Salamaua area resulted in the following losses for the 2/5th: 94 killed and 165 wounded.

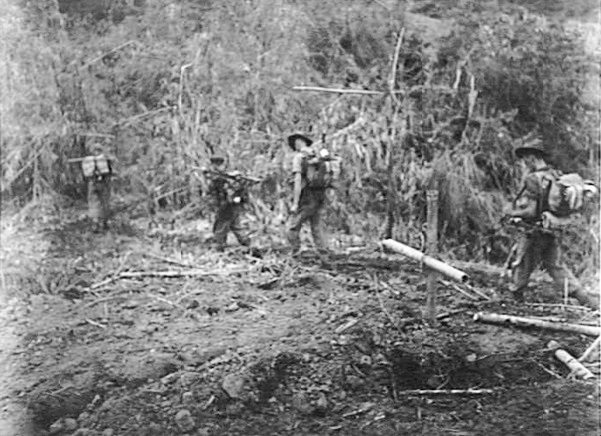
A patrol from the 2/5th around Yamil, July 1945

Concentrating at Wondecla, on the Atherton Tablelands in north Queensland, after an extended period of home leave during which time the Victorian and South Australian personnel took part in a march through Melbourne, the 2/5th Battalion spent the next year training on the Tablelands along with the rest of the 6th Division. There was also a large turn over in the battalion's personnel at this time, as it had been severely depleted due to illness during its previous campaign, and it was brought up to strength by April 1944 with several drafts of reinforcements, with the majority coming from New South Wales. To counter boredom and malaise amongst the men during late 1944, the battalion was occupied with a series of various sporting events and further leave. In the new year, a series of amphibious exercises were undertaken during this time with a view to preparing the battalion for future operations.

Finally, late in the war, the battalion received orders to deploy overseas again. Boarding the Duntroon on 24 November 1944, a week later the battalion arrived at Aitape in New Guinea. There, the 6th Division took over from the American garrison in order to free up the US troops for further fighting in the Philippines. Following disembarkation, the 2/5th concentrated around Tadji airstrip. In December, the Australians began offensive operations against the Japanese forces that were operating in the surrounding areas. For the next seven months until the war ended the 2/5th undertook patrols through the Torricelli and Prince Alexander mountain ranges, as the 17th Brigade worked to initially establish and hold the Australian base around Aitape, before moving inland towards Maprik and then on to Kiarivu to pursue the Japanese forces that had withdrawn into the interior. Although only intended as a mopping up campaign, it was an arduous and costly period. Consisting primarily of small unit actions which resulted in disproportionately heavy casualties for the Australians, throughout the course of the campaign the 2/5th suffered 146 casualties, including eight officers killed or wounded. (Note: Johnston provides 39 killed and 116 wounded.)

=== Disbandment and legacy ===
Following the end of the war, the 2/5th remained in New Guinea as personnel were posted into the unit from other units that were being disbanded. In September, the battalion was withdrawn from the Kaboibus area and flown back to Wewak. The battalion took part in a divisional parade in October while later that month it was declared "redundant" under demobilisation plans, and during this time many soldiers undertook educational or vocational training to prepare them for civilian life while they waited to return to Australia. In November, there was a considerable turn over in the battalion's troops, as members were posted to other units depending upon their demobilisation priority: these units included the 2/1st, the 2/2nd, the 2/6th, the 2/7th, and the 30th Infantry Battalions. After this, the battalion was left with only 108 personnel, all of whom possessed the required points for discharge. Finally, on 1 December 1945, the remaining personnel embarked upon the transport Duntroon, bound for Brisbane. A brief stay in camp at Chermside, in the Brisbane suburbs, followed before the battalion moved by rail to Victoria. Personnel detrained at Seymour and then moved by road to Puckapunyal. From there the Victorian, South Australian and Western Australian contingents marched out for discharge, leaving behind a small cadre staff.

The battalion was subsequently disbanded in early February 1946 while at Puckapunyal. Throughout its involvement in the war, a total of 2,967 men served with the 2/5th Battalion of whom 216 were killed, and 390 wounded. (Note: These figures differ from Johnston who provides 149 killed in action, 39 died of wounds, 5 died on active service, 401 wounded in action, and 115 captured.) Members of the battalion received two Distinguished Service Orders, 14 Military Crosses, six Distinguished Conduct Medals, 20 Military Medals, and 56 Mentions in Despatches; one member of the battalion was appointed as an Officer of the Order of the British Empire and three were appointed Members of the Order of the British Empire. Alongside the 2/3rd Battalion, the 2/5th was the only other Australian infantry battalion to fight against all the major Axis powers during the war.

In 1948, the Citizen Military Forces was re-constituted and the 5th Battalion, Victorian Scottish Regiment was re-raised. At the time many of its members were drawn from the 2/5th Battalion and because of its territorial and personnel links it was decided that the Victorian Scottish Regiment would take custody of the 2/5th Battalion's World War II battle honours. As a result of the reorganisation of the Australian Army in the 1960s, which saw the disbandment of the regionally-based single battalion regiments and the raising of new multi-battalion state-based regiments these battle honours were inherited by the 5th/6th Battalion, Royal Victoria Regiment, an Australian Army Reserve battalion based around Melbourne.

== Battle honours ==
The 2/5th Battalion received the following battle honours for its service during World War II:

- North Africa, Bardia 1941, Capture of Tobruk, Syria 1941, Merjayun, Damour, Greece 1941, South-West Pacific 1942–1945, Wau, Bobdubi II, Mubo II, Mount Tambu, Komiatum, Liberation of Australian New Guinea, Perimbil, Balif, Yamil–Ulupu, Kaboibus–Kiarivu.

In 1961–1962, these battle honours were entrusted to the 5th Battalion, and through this link are maintained by the Royal Victoria Regiment.

== Commanding officers ==
The following officers commanded the 2/5th Battalion during the war:

- Lieutenant Colonel Thomas Page Cook (1939–1940);
- Lieutenant Colonel Hugh Wrigley (1940–1941);
- Lieutenant Colonel Roy King (1941);
- Lieutenant Colonel Patrick Daniel Sarsfield Starr (1942–1943);
- Lieutenant Colonel Thomas Mayo Conroy (1943–1944);
- Lieutenant Colonel Alfred William Buttrose (1944–1945).

== See also ==
- Military history of Australia during World War II

== Notes ==
Footnotes

Citations
