= 2/6th Battalion (Australia) =

Infantry battalion of the Australian Army during the Second World War

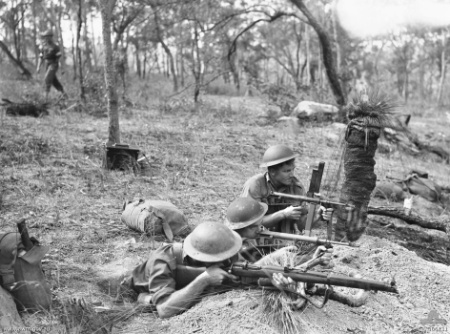
- Three infantrymen of the Australian 2/6th Battalion training in the Watsonville area of North Queensland, April 1944
- Active: 25 October 1939 – 18 February 1946
- Country: Australia
- Branch: Australian Army
- Type: Infantry
- Size: ~800–900 men (Note: By the start of World War II, the authorised strength of an Australian infantry battalion was 910 men all ranks, however, later in the war it fell to 803.)
- Part of: 17th Brigade, 6th Division
- Motto: "Nothing over us"
- Colours: Purple over red
- Engagements: Second World War: Greek campaign; North African campaign; Syrian campaign; New Guinea campaign; Aitape–Wewak campaign

Insignia
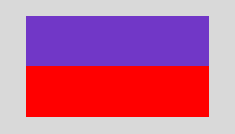
- Unit colour patch

The 2/6th Battalion was an infantry battalion of the Australian Army that served during the Second World War. Raised in October 1939 as part of the all-volunteer Second Australian Imperial Force, the battalion formed part of the 6th Division and was among the first troops raised by Australia during the war. Departing Australia in early 1940, the 2/6th were deployed to the Middle East where in January 1941, it took part in the first action of the war by Australian ground forces, the Battle of Bardia, which was followed by further actions around Tobruk. Later, the 2/6th were dispatched to take part in the Battle of Greece, although they were evacuated after only a short involvement in the campaign. Some members of the battalion subsequently fought on Crete with a composite 17th Brigade battalion, and the battalion had to be re-formed in Palestine before being sent to Syria in 1941–42, where they formed part of the Allied occupation force that was established there in the aftermath of the Syria–Lebanon campaign.

In mid-1942, the battalion was withdrawn from the Middle East to help face the threat posed by the Japanese in the Pacific. A period of garrison duty was undertaken in Ceylon between March and July 1942, before they arrived back in Australia in August 1942. The 2/6th was then deployed to New Guinea in January 1943, fighting around Wau and advancing towards Salamaua during the Salamaua–Lae campaign. In September 1943, they were withdrawn to the Atherton Tablelands for rest, and did not see action again until later in the war, when they were committed to the Aitape–Wewak campaign in late 1944. The 2/6th remained in New Guinea until the end of the war, and was disbanded in February 1946, having returned to Puckapunyal the previous December.

== History ==
=== Formation and training ===
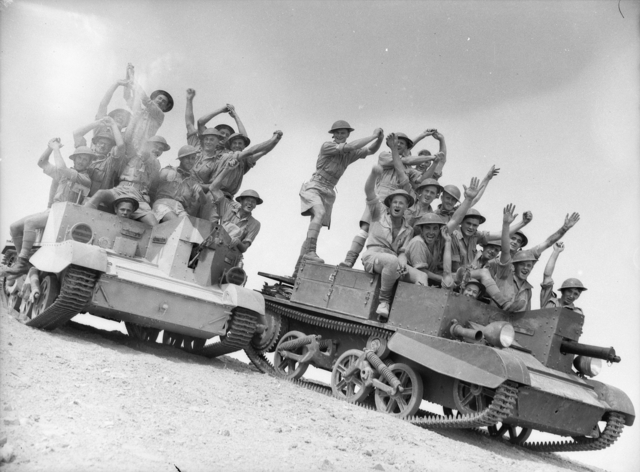
Soldiers from the 2/6th on Bren Carriers in Egypt, October 1940.

The 2/6th Battalion (Note: The numerical designation of 2nd AIF units was prefixed by "2/", which was used to set them apart from Militia units with corresponding numerical designations.) was raised at the Royal Melbourne Showgrounds on 25 October 1939, as part of the all volunteer Second Australian Imperial Force, which was raised for overseas service at the start of the war. The battalion's motto was "Nothing over us", which it adopted due to a popular Coles advertising slogan of the time which used the words "Nothing over 2/6". The colours chosen for the battalion's unit colour patch (UCP) were the same as those of the 6th Battalion, a unit which had served during World War I before being raised as a Militia formation in 1921. These colours were purple over red, in a horizontal rectangular shape, although a border of gray was added to the UCP to distinguish the battalion from its Militia counterpart.

In early November, after it had started concentration, the battalion – consisting at that stage of just a small cadre force of officers and non-commissioned officers drawn mainly from several Militia units including the 14th, the 23rd/21st, the 29th, and the 46th Battalions – was moved to Puckapunyal, Victoria. While there, it received a number of drafts of recruits and was brought up to strength. With an authorised strength of around 900 personnel, like other Australian infantry battalions of the time, the battalion was formed around a nucleus of four rifle companies – designated 'A' through to 'D' – each consisting of three platoons.

A short period of rudimentary training followed under the tutelage of members of the Australian Instructional Corps. This was completed by April 1940, and that month the battalion – under the command of Lieutenant Colonel Arthur Godfrey, a First World War veteran who had previously commanded the 23rd/21st Battalion – embarked for the Middle East on the transport ship Neuralia, departing from Port Melbourne and sailing via Fremantle, Colombo, Aden and the Suez Canal. At this time it was attached to the 17th Brigade, which was assigned to the 6th Division. Recruited from Victoria – although at various times the battalion's composition was boosted by recruits from other states – the 17th also consisted of the 2/5th, 2/7th and 2/8th Battalions.

=== Middle East, Greece and Crete ===
Upon their arrival in mid-May, the battalion established itself around Beit Jirja, and completed its training at various locations in Palestine and Egypt. In early January 1941, the 6th Division was committed to the fighting in Libya, and the 2/6th took part in the first action of the war by Australian ground forces, the Battle of Bardia, during which they fought against Italian forces. The battalion's involvement in the battle was meant to be limited to creating a diversion for the main attack, but in the end proved to be its most costly, resulting in 22 killed and 51 wounded. This was followed by further actions around Tobruk later in the month, attacking across the Bardia–Tobruk road towards the harbour through Wadi ed Delia during the 6th Division's assault. Afterwards, the 2/6th was transported to El Gazala, 45 miles (72 km) west of Torbuk, where they continued the advance to Derna and beyond in late January, advancing on a two-company front during which they clashed briefly with Italians from the 86th Regiment, capturing over 400. In February, the 2/6th detached personnel to garrison the towns of Barce and Benghazi before moving to Mersa Matruh, where they received new equipment, in late March 1941. Casualties during this period were 24 dead and 75 wounded.

In early April 1941, the 6th Division was dispatched to Greece, where they fought a very brief campaign following the German invasion of that country in the middle of the month. Overwhelmed, the Allied forces were forced back over the course of several weeks during which the 2/6th took part in several desperate rearguard actions and withdrawals during which the battalion lost 28 men killed and 43 wounded. Finally, they were evacuated by sea at the end of the month, but amidst the confusion a large number of the battalion's personnel – 217 personnel from all ranks – were captured, while others were landed on Crete, instead of Alexandria in Egypt, after the ship on which they were sailing, the Costa Rica, was sunk. On Crete, 13 officers and 202 other ranks from the 2/6th were organised into a 17th Brigade composite battalion along with men from the brigade's other battalions less the 2/7th. They subsequently fought unsuccessfully to repulse the German invasion that came in May, after which many more became prisoners of war.

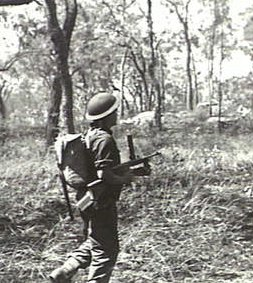
A soldier from the 2/6th with an Owen gun during an exercise in Queensland, April 1944

The battalion's losses in Greece and Crete were heavy, totaling 30 dead, 54 wounded and 353 captured. As a result, the 2/6th had to be re-formed in Palestine and brought back up to strength with reinforcements before it was dispatched Syria in December 1941, to join the Allied garrison that had been established there as occupation force at the conclusion of the Syria–Lebanon campaign against the Vichy French. In early 1942, the Australian government decided to bring the 6th Division back to Australia to help bolster its defences following Japan's entry into the war. Consequently, in March the battalion embarked from Suez on the transport HMT Otranto, bound for Australia.

=== Ceylon and New Guinea ===
On its way home, the battalion – along with the 16th Brigade and the rest of the 17th Brigade – was landed on Ceylon due to the perceived threat of a Japanese invasion there. The battalion remained there for five months, constructing defences and conducting jungle training at various locations including Lake Koggala, Weligama, Matara, Tangalle and Hambantota. After the threat of invasion passed, the battalion eventually returned to Melbourne on the transport HMT Athlone Castle, arriving in early August 1942, at the height of the fighting along the Kokoda Track in Papua.

A period of reorganisation and training followed as the battalion was prepared for the rigours of jungle warfare. The battalion concentrated at the Nagambie Road Camp in central Victoria initially, but in late September moved to Greta in New South Wales. In October, after a period of intense training, the 2/6th was moved to Brisbane from where, on 13 October 1942, they embarked on the Dutch merchant ship Bontekoe, bound for Milne Bay for the first of their two campaigns there against the Japanese. After arriving at Milne Bay, where the 17th Brigade was held in reserve, on 19 October they remained there until January 1943, when the battalion embarked upon the MV Pulganbar and several smaller coastal vessels and moved to Port Moresby. From Moresby, they were airlifted to Wau on 14 January. During the battalion's time around Milne Bay, they had suffered heavily from malaria and over 300 men were in hospital at the time the battalion deployed to Wau; consequently, it was severely understrength by the time it went into battle. Nevertheless, throughout late January 1943, the battalion was heavily involved in the Battle of Wau, then afterwards took part in the advance on Salamaua, during which it fought several key actions, including the fighting around Lababia Ridge in late June, before supporting the landing at Nassau Bay and the Battle of Mubo in July and then taking part in the fighting around Mount Tambu and Komiatum Ridge in August. During the fighting the battalion sustained casualties of 59 dead and 133 wounded.

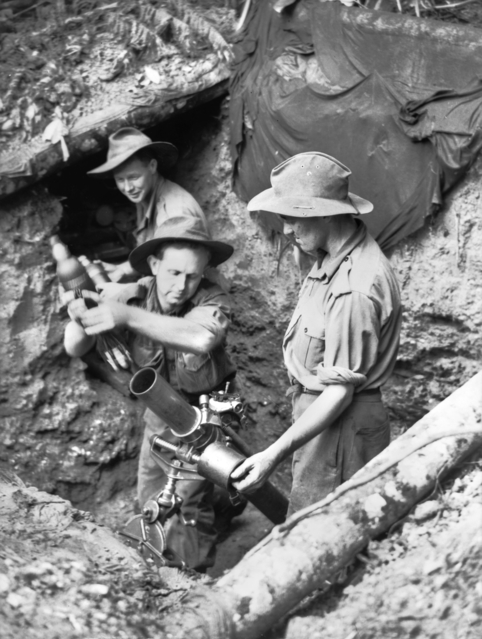
A 3-inch mortar from the 2/6th's headquarters company, New Guinea, August 1943.

In late September 1943, the 2/6th were withdrawn to Australia for rest, sailing from Milne Bay on a Dutch transport, the Bosch Fontein, landing in Cairns. They spent the next year training at Wondecla on the Atherton Tablelands in Queensland prior to their final campaign of the war: the Aitape–Wewak campaign. Arriving at Aitape in December 1944, the 2/6th spent the remainder of the war – a period of eight months – carrying out a "mopping up campaign" to clear the Japanese from the surrounding areas, conducting a series of patrols and advances through the Torricelli and Prince Alexander Ranges, advancing to Maprik in the early stages of the campaign, and then helping to capture the town of Yamil 6 miles (9.7 km) to the west, clearing a series of jungle ridges in the process before continuing the drive inland towards Ulunkohoitu in an effort to pin Japanese forces down while the 2/7th Battalion conducted a wide sweep towards Kiarivu. Losses during this campaign numbered 37 dead and 85 wounded.

The war came to an end in mid-August 1945 following Japan's surrender in the wake of the atomic bombings of Hiroshima and Nagasaki. At the conclusion of the fighting, the 2/6th remained in New Guinea, concentrating in the area around Wewak. The battalion's strength was slowly reduced as personnel were repatriated back to Australia individually for demobilisation based upon a formal points system. On 13 December 1945, the battalion's remaining personnel sailed for Australia, eventually returning to Puckapunyal. As the battalion's personnel were slowly demobilised or transferred out to other units its strength decreased rapidly until it was finally disbanded on 18 February 1946. Those personnel who were not discharged were transferred to other units for further service.

During the war, a total of 2,965 men served with the battalion, of whom 179 were killed and 335 wounded. Members of the battalion received the following decorations: four Distinguished Service Orders, 15 Military Crosses, five Distinguished Conduct Medals, 35 Military Medals, and 63 Mentions in Despatches.

== Battle honours ==
The 2/6th received the following battle honours:

- North Africa, Bardia 1941, Capture of Tobruk, Greece 1941, South-West Pacific 1942–1945, Wau, Lababia Ridge, Bobdubi II, Mubo II, Komiatum, Liberation of Australian New Guinea, Maprik, Yamil–Ulupu, Kaboibus–Kiarivu.

These honours were subsequently entrusted to the 6th Battalion in 1961, and through this link are maintained by the Royal Victoria Regiment.

== Commanding officers ==
The following officers commanded the 2/6th during the war:

- Lieutenant Colonel Arthur Harry Langham Godfrey (1939–41);
- Lieutenant Colonel Hugh Wrigley (1941–42);
- Lieutenant Colonel Frederick George Wood (1942–45);
- Lieutenant Colonel David Arion Collingwood Jackson (1945).

== See also ==
- Military history of Australia during World War II

== Notes ==
Footnotes

Citations
