= 2/7th Battalion (Australia) =

Former infantry battalion of the Australian Army

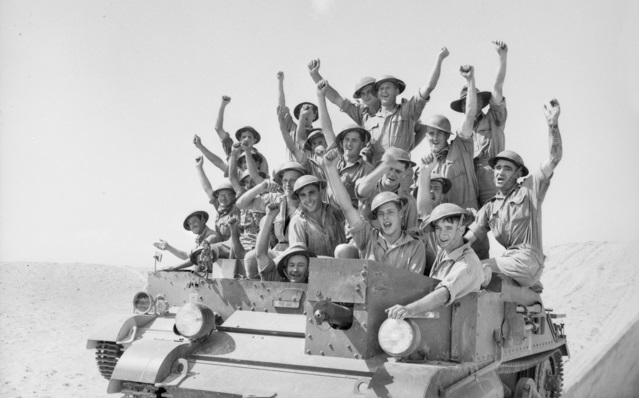
- Members of the 2/7th Battalion with a Bren carrier in October 1940
- Active: 25 October 1939 – February 1946
- Country: Australia
- Branch: Army
- Type: Infantry
- Size: ~800–900 officers and men (Note: By the start of World War II, the authorised strength of an Australian infantry battalion was 910 men all ranks, however, later in the war it fell to 803.)
- Part of: 17th Brigade, 6th Division
- Colours: Brown over red
- Engagements: World War II: North African campaign; Greece; Crete; Syrian campaign; New Guinea campaign; Aitape–Wewak campaign

Insignia
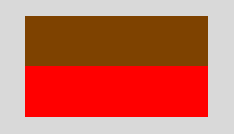
- Unit colour patch

The 2/7th Battalion was an infantry battalion of the Australian Army raised for service during World War II. Formed as part of the 6th Division shortly after the outbreak of the war as part of the all-volunteer Second Australian Imperial Force, the 2/7th Battalion's initial personnel were recruited primarily from the state of Victoria, although later reinforcements were drawn from most other Australian states. Basic training was completed in Australia, after which the battalion embarked for the Middle East as part of the first batch of Australian troops to deploy overseas. Further training was undertaken in Palestine before the battalion went into action against the Italians in January 1941. After participating in the successful capture of Bardia and Tobruk, it was committed to the disastrous Battles of Greece and Crete, where the battalion was essentially destroyed after the majority of its personnel were captured.

Rebuilt in Palestine, the 2/7th undertook garrison duties in Syria and then Ceylon before being transported back to Australia in August 1942. In January 1943, the battalion was deployed to New Guinea, taking part in the fighting against the Japanese in the Salamaua–Lae campaign until October 1943. Following a period of over a year training in northern Queensland, the battalion's final campaign began in the Aitape–Wewak area of New Guinea in 1944–1945 during which it was used mainly in a mopping-up role. The battalion was disbanded in Australia in early 1946 after the conclusion of hostilities.

== History ==
=== Formation and training ===
The 2/7th Battalion (Note: The numerical designation of 2nd AIF units was prefixed by "2/", which was used to set them apart from Militia units with corresponding numerical designations.) was established on 25 October 1939 at Puckapunyal, Victoria, as part of the all-volunteer Second Australian Imperial Force that was raised for service during World War II. The battalion consisted of four rifle companies – designated 'A' to 'D' – under a headquarters company and a battalion headquarters, and had an authorised strength of around 900 personnel. Within the headquarters company there were six specialist platoons (signals, pioneer, anti-aircraft, transport, administrative and mortars) to provide organic combat and service support to the four rifle companies.

The colours chosen for the battalion's unit colour patch (UCP) were the same as those of the 7th Battalion, which had been raised for service during World War I as part of the First Australian Imperial Force, and had later been re-raised as a Militia battalion. These colours were brown over red, in a horizontal rectangular shape, although a border of grey was added to the UCP to distinguish the battalion from its Militia counterpart. The troops of the 2/7th gave themselves the nickname "Mud over Blood", in reference to the brown over red of their insignia, and to the original 7th Battalion. Attached to the 17th Brigade, the second brigade of the 6th Division, recruits were drawn from several areas in Victoria including rural areas around Mildura, Robinvale, Sale, and Maffra, and metropolitan Melbourne. (Note: Reinforcements were later drawn in small numbers from other states, including New South Wales, Queensland, Tasmania and Western Australia, and there were also a couple of New Zealanders by 1943–1944.) These included a mix of former Militia soldiers and those who had no previous military experience. After its personnel had reported for duty, the battalion undertook training at the Royal Melbourne Showgrounds and Puckapunyal before departing for the Middle East in mid-April 1940, aboard the troopship Strathallan. The battalion's first commanding officer was Lieutenant Colonel Theodore Walker, a former Militia officer who had previously commanded the 24th/39th Battalion.

=== Service in the Middle East, Greece and Crete ===
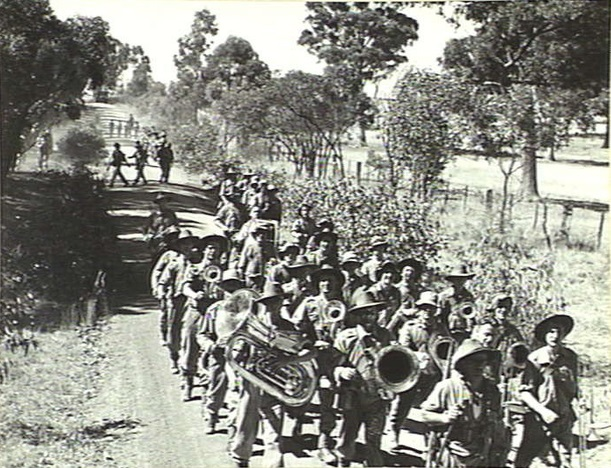
Troops from the 2/7th march to the rifle range at Puckapunyal, February 1940

Reaching their destination in May 1940, the battalion joined the 17th Brigade's two other infantry battalions – the 2/5th and 2/6th – at Beit Jirja, in the Julius–Gaza area. From there, the battalion engaged in further training in Palestine and Egypt until the Australians went into battle for the first time in early January 1941 as the British went on the offensive against the Italians in North Africa. The 2/7th later saw action at Bardia, where it formed the divisional reserve in the initial phase before attacking south through the gap established by the 2/5th towards the railway switchline, and Tobruk, where the 2/7th attacked the eastern sector. Later, the battalion undertook garrison duties in Libya, establishing itself around Marsa Brega. The fighting in Libya cost the battalion 20 dead, including 15 killed in action, 75 wounded and one captured.

Following this, the battalion was committed to the fighting in Greece in early April. Landing at Athens, and moving to Larissa by train, the battalion established themselves around Thessaly, but their involvement in the fighting was short-lived as the Germans advanced quickly against the hastily established Allied defensive positions, forcing the British and Commonwealth troops to withdraw. Embarking from Kalamata upon the transport Costa Rica on 26 April, the battalion endured heavy air attack as the Germans attacked the ship, forcing it to be abandoned. The men from the 2/7th were taken off the stricken ship and transferred to several Royal Navy destroyers, and landed on the island of Crete, where an Axis invasion was expected imminently. Missing most of their equipment, which had been lost on the Costa Rica, the battalion was re-armed with weapons re-allocated from two Australian artillery regiments.

Following the German airborne assault on 20 May, the 2/7th became heavily engaged fighting German parachute troops around Canea. It then undertook a local counter-attack at 42nd Street during which the 2/7th launched a ferocious bayonet charge in concert with the New Zealand Maori Battalion that resulted in heavy German casualties. The 2/7th later covered the withdrawal to Sphakia where the Royal Navy attempted to evacuate the garrison by the sea, undertaking a three-day stand in the hills, before they were ordered down to the evacuation beaches. As Allied naval losses mounted the operation was called off before the 2/7th could embark. As a result, most of the battalion – over 400 personnel – was taken prisoner. Several 2/7th soldiers later escaped captivity; one of them, John Peck, became part of a Special Operations Executive team responsible for helping Allied prisoners of war escape. The battalion's commanding officer, Walker, was one of those captured, giving up his position on one of the last evacuation ships when it became apparent that the rest of the battalion would not have time to get clear. Walker remained in captivity until the end of the war, along with many others of the battalion who went to prisoner of war camps in Greece, Germany, Austria and Poland.

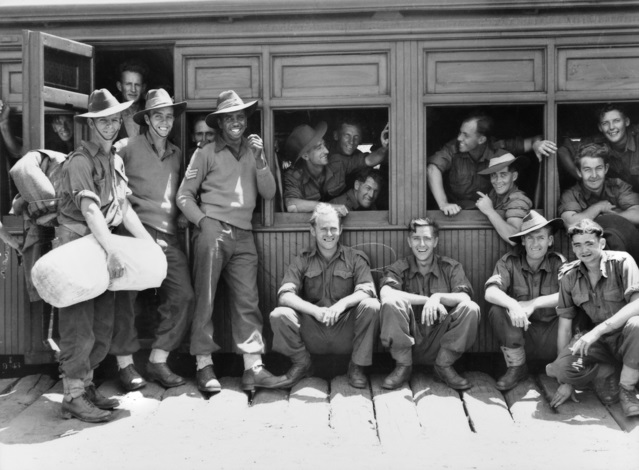
Troops from the 2/7th Battalion, including then Sergeant Reg Saunders, who was later the first Australian Aboriginal commissioned into the Australian Army, at Innisfail, waiting for the south-bound leave train to depart, October 1943.

The battalion's casualties in Greece and Crete were heavy and by the end of the campaign it had essentially been destroyed. The fighting in Greece resulted in eight dead and seven wounded, as well as 65 captured, while a further 27 were killed in action on Crete, and one was killed in an accident. A further 70 were wounded and 433 were taken prisoner. Instead of being disbanded, the unit was rebuilt from a small cadre of personnel who had not been sent to Crete (about 50 men) along with a large number of reinforcements, and the 16 personnel who had escaped Crete. This was undertaken in Palestine under the command of Lieutenant Colonel Henry Guinn, before the 2/7th was sent to Syria to perform occupation duties as part of the garrison that had been established there following the conclusion of the Syria–Lebanon campaign.

=== Fighting in New Guinea ===
In early 1942, following Japan's entry into the war, the Australian government requested the return of the 6th Division from the Middle East. On 10 March, the battalion embarked for Australia aboard the troopship HMT Westernland. En route the 2/7th was diverted to Ceylon where it undertook defensive duties as part of an Australian force made up of the 16th and 17th Brigades to defend against the threat of a Japanese invasion. Returning to Australia in August 1942 on board MV Athlone Castle, the 2/7th spent a short period of time preparing to fight the Japanese in New Guinea. Concentrating around Seymour, Victoria, a welcome home parade was held in Melbourne, after which the battalion moved by rail to Greta, New South Wales, in September. A short time later, there was a further move north to Ascot, Queensland, from where the battalion embarked on the HMAT Tasman in mid-October, bound for Gili-Gili airstrip, near Milne Bay. In November, a detachment of the battalion's Bren carrier crews were sent to support the Australian and US units fighting around Buna–Gona. A makeshift and hasty measure to make up for the lack of tank support, the lightly armoured carriers proved ineffective, and the 2/7th's detachment suffered heavy casualties with six killed and four wounded and most of the carriers destroyed. Meanwhile, around Milne Bay, the rest of the battalion undertook further training before being committed to the fighting around Wau in January 1943 as the Australians began limited offensive operations in New Guinea following the Japanese defeat in the Kokoda Track campaign and around Buna–Gona. After being flown into Wau, where they landed under fire, the 2/7th took part in a series of battles as the Australians advanced on Salamaua, with significant actions being fought around Mubo and Bobdubi. During the campaign, Guinn was hospitalised due to illness and Major Keith Picken temporarily led the battalion between July and December 1943. The 2/7th's casualties during its first jungle campaign amounted to 99 dead from all causes, including 70 killed in action, and 225 wounded.

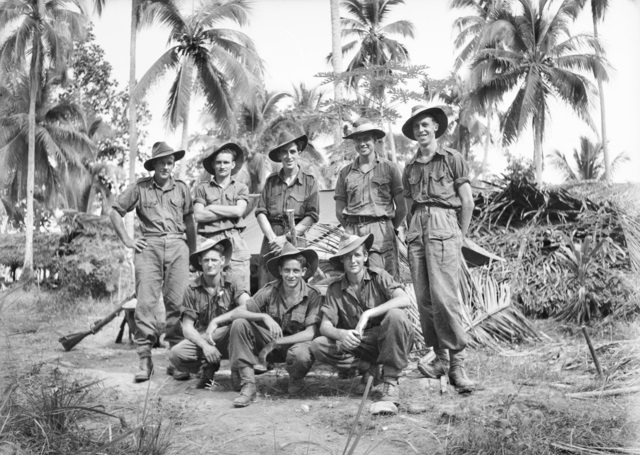
A 2/7th Battalion patrol, New Guinea, 17 August 1945

The 2/7th returned to Australia in early October 1943. After a period of leave, the battalion concentrated around Wondecla, on the Atherton Tablelands. During this time the units of the 6th Division were converted to the jungle divisional establishment. This saw a reduction in the battalion's vehicle allocation and a reorganisation of its specialist platoons, with its Bren carriers and heavy vehicles being replaced by jeeps and the anti-aircraft platoon being disbanded. A medium machine gun platoon was added and new anti-tank weapons were also received. The battalion's authorised strength was also reduced to around 800 personnel; however, throughout late 1943 and into early 1944 the 2/7th was well below this due to illnesses and recurring diseases, such as malaria, amongst personnel who had returned from New Guinea. Nevertheless, a long period of training followed and the battalion was rebuilt over time and did not see further action until late in the war when the 6th Division was committed to the Aitape–Wewak campaign, in order to release US troops for operations in the Philippines. At the start of the new campaign, Guinn was relieved of his command and appointed commandant of the Land Headquarters Tactical School. In his place, Lieutenant Colonel Philip Parbury took command of the battalion, which deployed aboard the US transport ship Mexico.

Essentially a mopping up operation by the time the Australians arrived, the Aitape–Wewak campaign saw the Australians establish themselves around Tadji airfield at Aitape in late 1944 before conducting a limited offensive through the Torricelli and Prince Alexander Ranges throughout 1944 and 1945. During these operations, after the 17th Brigade had been relieved from defensive duties around Tadji, the 2/7th engaged in a series of small unit actions against the Japanese and was involved in capturing Maprik. Later, the battalion continued the advance east towards Yamil before being withdrawn back to Aitape in early June 1945 following an attack around a position dubbed "Lone Tree Hill". In mid-July, the battalion resumed operations, advancing towards the airfield at Kairivu. Further small-scale actions were fought, and by the end of the campaign in mid-August, the battalion's casualties totalled 129. These included 22 killed in action, 11 who died of wounds, five accidentally killed and 95 wounded.

=== Disbandment ===
After the war, the battalion remained in the Kairivu area throughout September and into early October, when the majority of the battalion moved back to Wewak. Patrols were sent out into the surrounding areas as Japanese soldiers were brought in for surrender and repatriation. Meanwhile, the demobilisation process began with high priority long service troops being repatriated to Australia in drafts as shipping became available. At this time, some of the battalion's personnel volunteered for service in Japan as part of the British Commonwealth Occupation Force. The majority of these were transferred to the 67th Infantry Battalion, although some also served in the 66th Infantry Battalion. By November, the battalion was down to a posted strength of just 375 personnel. On 18 December 1945, the remaining cadre of the battalion embarked for Australia. As personnel marched out of the unit – either for demobilisation or for subsequent service – and equipment was handed back, the unit was disbanded at Puckapunyal in February 1946.

During the war, a total of 3,155 personnel served in the 2/7th Battalion. Of these, 143 were killed in action, 36 died of wounds, and 14 died of other causes. A further 472 were wounded in action and 499 were taken prisoner. Members of the battalion received the following decorations: 6 Distinguished Service Orders, 11 Military Crosses, 5 Distinguished Conduct Medals, 26 Military Medals, and 60 Mentions in Despatches. In addition, two personnel were appointed Members of the Order of the British Empire.

== Battle honours ==
The 2/7th Battalion received the following battle honours:

- North Africa, Bardia 1941, Capture of Tobruk, Greece 1941, Middle East 1941–1944, Crete, Canea, 42nd Street, Withdrawal to Sphakia, South-West Pacific 1942–1945, Wau, Mubo I, Bobdubi II, Komiatum, Liberation of Australian New Guinea, Maprik, Yamil–Ulupu, Kaboibus–Kiarivu.

In 1961–62, these battle honours were entrusted to the 7th Battalion, and through this link are maintained by the 8th/7th Battalion, Royal Victoria Regiment.

== Commanding officers ==
The following officers commanded the 2/7th Battalion:

- Lieutenant Colonel Theodore Gordon Walker (1939–1941);
- Lieutenant Colonel Henry George Guinn (1941–1944); and
- Lieutenant Colonel Philip Kingsmill Parbury (1944–1945).

== Notes ==
Footnotes

Citations
