= Mubo =

Village in Papua New Guinea

Mubo is a village located inland from Salamaua town, and is located in Salamaua Rural LLG, Morobe Province, Papua New Guinea at 7.21667°S 147.00001°E. Mubo was occupied by the Imperial Japanese on 14 May 1943 during the Second World War. Australian Army forces liberated the village in July 1943.
