= Landing at Nassau Bay =

- Part of World War II, Pacific War
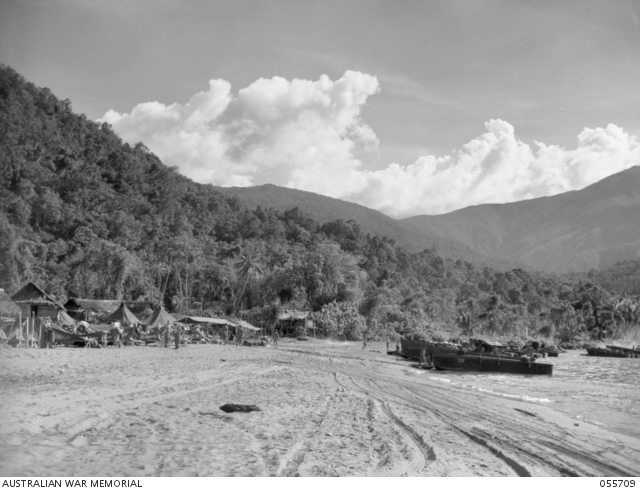
- Allied landing craft at Nassau Bay, August 1943
Date	30 June – 6 July 1943
Location	Nassau Bay area, Morobe Province, Territory of New Guinea
Result	Allied victory

Belligerents
United States; Australia	Japan

Commanders and leaders
(Australia) Stanley Savige (United States) Ross MacKechnie	(Empire of Japan) Hatazō Adachi (Empire of Japan) Hidemitsu Nakano (Empire of Japan) Tsunendo Takamura

Units involved
1/162nd Infantry Regiment; 2/6th Infantry Battalion; Papuan Infantry Battalion; 2nd Engineer Special Brigade	III/102nd Battalion; III/66th Infantry Regiment

Strength
~1,400	~ 600

Casualties and losses
23 killed, 27 wounded	~ 76 killed

The Landing at Nassau Bay was an amphibious landing by Allied forces at Nassau Bay during the New Guinea campaign of World War II that took place between 30 June and 6 July 1943. The operation was undertaken so that Allies could secure a beachhead to establish a supply point to shorten their supply lines for the proposed attack on Salamaua as part of the Salamaua–Lae campaign and resulted in a battalion-sized force of U.S. infantry and supporting elements being landed largely unopposed on the south-eastern flank of the battle zone.

Due to bad weather, the landing force suffered heavy equipment losses with most of the U.S. landing craft being wrecked in heavy seas. Nevertheless, the U.S. troops were able to secure a lodgement from where they subsequently broke out, advancing north as part of a flanking drive on Salamaua, which was launched in conjunction with attacks by Australian forces further west. Australian forces also provided support during the landing, marking the landing beaches, and providing diversionary attacks against nearby Japanese forces. The landing was subsequently exploited with two more U.S. infantry battalions being landed throughout early July, along with Australian and U.S. artillery batteries, which were used to help reduce the Japanese positions around the Salamaua battle zone in the following months as the Allies sought to draw Japanese reinforcements away from Lae.

== Background ==
In late June and early July, Allied forces were advancing towards Salamaua, having secured the airfield at Wau earlier in the year. Up to that point, the Australian forces that were fighting around Mubo and Bobdubi had been resupplied by air and Allied planners determined the need to relieve some of the logistics burden on their aircraft by seizing Nassau Bay, which was about 15 miles (24 km) south of the Allies' ultimate objective. The plan was made following a recommendation from Commander Morton C. Mumma to the Allied South West Pacific Area GHQ that a beachhead at Nassau Bay would greatly shorten the supply line for Australian and American troops fighting in the Salamaua region. Colonel Archibald R. MacKechnie, commander of the 162nd Infantry Regiment, later flew to the Bulolo Valley for a conference with the Australian commanders – Major General Frank Berryman, Lieutenant Colonel John Wilton and Brigadier Murray Moten – to discuss the proposed landings.

During the night of 28 June, the 162nd Infantry Regiment's Intelligence and Reconnaissance Platoon placed lights upon islands lying offshore between Nassau Bay and Mageri Point to guide the invasion flotilla. 'D' Company of the Australian 2/6th Infantry Battalion from Lababia Ridge was required to march to the mouth of the Bitoi River to divert Japanese attention from Nassau Bay. Also, one of 'D' Company's platoons was sent to the landing beach to set up lights to guide the landing craft. 'A' Company of the Papuan Infantry Battalion reconnoitered to Cape Dinga just south of Nassau Bay for the southern flank.

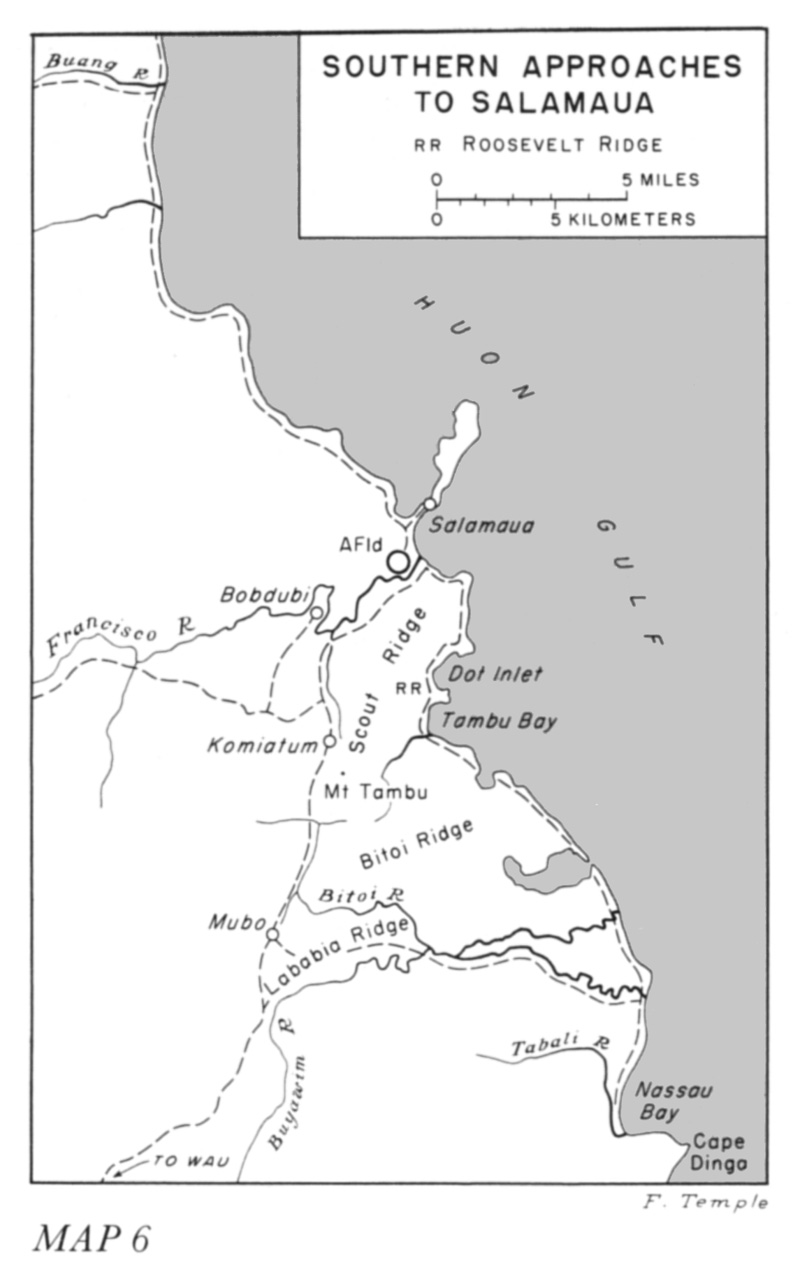
Map of key locations during the fighting around Salamaua

The main Japanese force defending Nassau Bay was III/102nd Battalion, under the command of Major Tsunendo Takamura. Heavily depleted from fighting against Australian forces around Bobdubi, Takamura's battalion consisted of two under strength rifle companies, a machine gun company and a headquarters with a total strength of 180 personnel. In addition, small detachments of marines and engineers were also located nearby. Further afield, the Japanese had established strong posts around the mouth of the Bitoi River and at Cape Dinga, where it was estimated that there were about 375 personnel; in between there were several small outposts. The Japanese units were orientated to defend against a landing in the Huon Gulf, rather than at Nassau Bay. These forces were part of Hidemitsu Nakano's 51st Division, which in turn formed part of Hatazō Adachi's Eighteenth Army.

== Landing ==
The landing was timed to take place in conjunction with similar operations on Woodlark and Kiriwina, in New Guinea, and on Rendova, in New Georgia. Prior to the landing B-25s from the U.S. Fifth Air Force bombed Japanese strong points along the Bitoi River, and A-20s pounded a supply dump on the southern side of Nassau Bay on 29 June. The amphibious landing force was known as MacKechnie Force. Consisting of the combined elements of Colonel MacKechnie's American 162d Regiment as well as Australian units, MacKechnie Force embarked from Mort Bay at dusk on 29 June. PT boats PT-142, PT-143, and PT-120 of the U.S. Seventh Fleet took aboard 210 men of Lieutenant Colonel Harold Taylor's 1st Battalion, 162nd Infantry Regiment, with PT-68 providing escort. Twenty-nine LCVPs, two requisitioned Japanese barges of the 2nd Engineer Special Brigade, and two Landing Craft Mechanized of the 532nd Engineer Boat and Shore Regiment took the remainder of force – numbering 770 men – on board at Mageri Point. The landing force was organized into three waves.

With rough seas, heavy rain, and poor visibility the landing force lost escort PT-68 after leaving Mort Bay. PT-142 with Lieutenant Commander Barry K. Atkins led the first wave of landing craft out of Mort Bay and due to poor visibility obscuring the offshore island guide lights the first wave overshot Nassau Bay by up to 3 miles (4.8 km). Time was taken turning around and finding the convoy again.

At Nassau Bay, a platoon of 'D' Company, 2/6th Infantry Battalion of the Australian 17th Infantry Brigade, from Mubo set landing markers to guide the landing craft into the beachhead. As the first wave with PT-142 arrived at Nassau Bay, PT-143 arrived with the second wave landing craft. In the confusion, the landing craft of the various waves bunched up and, according to Miller, "landed on the same stretch of beach" in 10–12-foot (3.0–3.7 m) pounding surf. The landing craft were pushed far up on the beach, with seventeen unable to get off the beach which became flooded. The Landing Craft Mechanized, after unloading a bulldozer was able to proceed back out to sea and retrieved the troops off PT 142 and then returned to the beach, where it too began taking on water and became flooded.

The landing had been unopposed with 770 men landed at Nassau Bay. Nevertheless, the landing craft breached were wrecked and most of the radios were damaged by salt water. PT-143 and PT-120 returned to the advanced PT boat base at Morobe, while PT-142 and PT-68 provided seaward protection. The Japanese defending the landing area – consisting of a small six-man observation post – offered a brief defence before fleeing into the jungle, believing according to Miller, "that the bulldozer was a tank". The third wave of landing craft with PT-120 arrived hours after the first two waves, and decided not to land until the surf abated. They took shelter in a cove down the coast, until the storm had subsided and returned to Nassau Bay but failed to find the beachhead. The wave returned to Mageri Point.

After a brief engagement with the Japanese, during the first night two U.S. infantry companies – 'A' and 'C' – secured a perimeter around the beachhead, with defensive positions being set up about 300 yards (270 m) north and south of the lodgement. Elsewhere, the Australian platoon provided flank security to the west on the inland aspect of the positionThroughout the night there was no fighting. At dawn on 30 June, beach clearance teams removed stores and equipment, while machine guns from the wrecked landing craft were brought ashore and established around the position to provide fire support to the perimeter. Meanwhile, 'C' Company ranged to the south in an effort to link up with the Papuan Infantry Battalion, which was located to the south of Cape Dinga, and they subsequently advanced to a position on the Tabali River, just west of Cape Dinga. 'A' Company patrolled north to the south arm of the Bitoi River and ran into Japanese mortar and machine gun fire and forward movement stopped. Patrols reported a strong Japanese present in the area. 'A' Company and the Australian platoon attempted to attack the Japanese western flank but the effort was turned back by stubborn defence. The Australians eventually ran out of ammunition and were relieved by a detachment of engineers from the crews of the landing craft that had been destroyed. Two platoons of 'C' Company rushed up from the south to join 'A' Company and at 15:00 began their advance. By 16:50 they had moved past the scattered Japanese opposition to reach the southern reaches of the Bitoi River.

Upon receiving word of landing, the 51st Division commander, Nakano, ordered the III/66th Battalion to march south from Salamaua. Presented with the dilemma of renewed Australian pressure around Bobdubi, the III/66th was tasked with carrying out a limited attack the U.S. and Australian forces around Nassau Bay, before carrying out delaying actions while the Nassau garrison withdrew towards Lake Salus. The Papuan Infantry Battalion began attacking the rear of the Japanese detachment of III/102nd Battalion at Cape Dinga, where at least 26 Japanese were killed after an attack on a Japanese bunker, and began moving toward the Nassau Bay beachhead. At 16:30 on 30 June, the remainder of 'C' Company defending the southern flank reported that Japanese troops were crossing the Tabali River just south of its position, and was ordered to withdraw to the southern densive flank of the beachhead and hold a line between the beach and a swamp a short distance inland. Before the remainder of 'C' Company could withdraw, Japanese troops attacked its rear and flank and the U.S. company was forced to fight its way north, for the loss of five men, including the platoon commander.

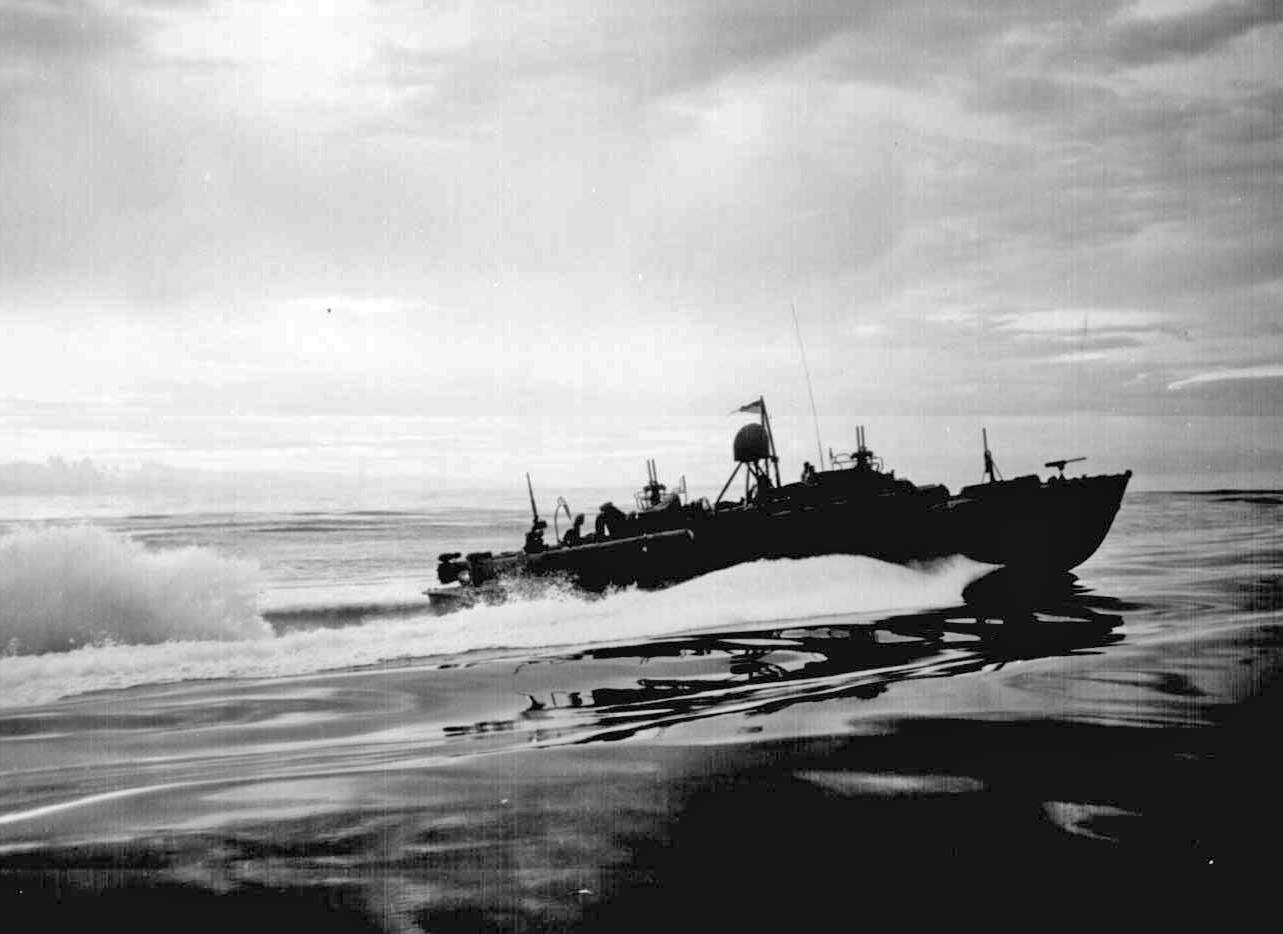
A PT boat patrols off New Guinea, 1943

Around the beachhead, a hastily prepared defensive line was established by an ad hoc force of engineers, Australian infantry, and headquarters personnel. As night fell, 'C' Company's platoon reached the southern part of the beachhead perimeter. The Japanese then attacked the defensive line in a series of attacks that lasted throughout the night, with machine gun, mortar, and rifle fire cracking around the American defensive positions in conjunction with grenade attacks. Small parties of Japanese soldiers attempted to infiltrate the positions, but were pushed back. The Japanese withdrew before sunrise on 1 July, having lost around 50 killed during the night. Allied casualties amounted to 18 killed, and 27 wounded, several of which were the result of friendly fire incidents. Patrols were subsequently sent out and began searching for Japanese stragglers during the morning.

On 2 July, reinforcements – drawn from the failed third wave – were dispatched aboard 11 landing craft, escorted by PT-149 and PT-145. The boats also strafed two Japanese held villages to the south of Nassau Bay near Cape Dinga. Further landing craft hauled by trawlers also arrived at Nassau Bay. The easternmost company of Australian 2/6th Infantry Battalion made contact with the northern perimeter of American troops at the south arm of the Bitoi River, and patrols by the Australians found that the Japanese defenders at Cape Dinga had been evacuated.

Four 75mm Pack Howitzer M1 artillery guns from the 218th Field Artillery Battalion were unloaded on the night of 2/3 July, together with reinforcements. MacKechnie Force patrols were then sent out towards Napier, guided by the Australian company from the 2/6th Infantry Battalion. By 4 July, more than 1,400 troops were ashore. PT-120 and PT-152 carried 140 troops to Nassau Bay, which were transferred to shore by landing craft. On 6 July, PT-120 and PT-149 transferred another 135 troops and escorted 11 landing craft to Nassau Bay.

== Aftermath ==
As a result of the landing at Nassau Bay, the Allied forces gained a vital supply point for the attack against Salamaua. Throughout early and mid-July, two more battalions of the 162nd Infantry Regiment were landed at Nassau Bay, and several Australian and U.S. artillery batteries were also brought ashore. The larger of these pieces were used to shell Japanese positions on the reverse slopes of the ridges in the surrounding areas, as well as Salamaua itself. Meanwhile, the Allied forces began a flanking drive on Salamaua, in conjunction with further actions to the west.

The Papuan Infantry Battalion advanced along the coast ahead of the 162nd Infantry Regiment and reached Lake Salus on 9 July and then pushed on to Tambu Bay. In mid-July, the advancing U.S. troops came up against strong Japanese defenses positioned a ridge overlooking the bay. This ridge, which provided good observation of Tambu Bay, allowing the Japanese to fire artillery down on to the landing beaches, was later named Roosevelt Ridge by the Americans, naming it after Major Archibald Roosevelt, the commander of the 3rd Battalion of the 162nd Infantry Regiment. The Battle of Roosevelt Ridge was subsequently fought between mid-July and mid-August, concurrently with actions to finally capture the village of Mubo and seize Mount Tambu as the Allies sought to draw reinforcements away from Lae, where an amphibious landing was planned for September 1943. Further afield, the U.S. also launched the New Georgia Campaign.
