= Raid on Salamaua (1942) =

The Raid on Salamaua was a conducted by Australian commandoes during the New Guinea campaign of World War II on 28 June 1942. It has been called the first offensive action on land against the Japanese in World War II. The raid was undertaken by 2/5th Independent Company under the command of Captain Norman Winning. According to one account, "The raid has been acclaimed as a copybook action for its diligent scouting, meticulous planning and audacious, multi-pronged attack against an enemy force 10 times the attackers' strength. All without loss of life."

== Raid ==
Salamaua had been the district headquarters for the Australian administration. It was occupied by the Japanese on 8 March 1942. A handful of pre-war residents of the town joined the New Guinea Volunteer Rifles and fled into the bush to spy on the Japanese.

In June 1942 the only fit, trained Australian troops in the area were around 450 men of the 2/5th Independent Company. It was decided that this force was too small to tackle the Japanese head on in battle but was big enough to undertake a raid.

The raid was planned and led by Captain Norman Winning, using reconnaissance from the New Guinea Volunteer Rifles under the command of Sergeant Jim McAdam. Their targets were the airfield, wireless masts, a bridge and troop billets.

The troops left their base at 2 pm on 28 June. They were seven sections, one of which carried a 3-inch mortar. Their other weapons included Tommy guns, rifles, Bren guns, grenades and a sticky bomb.

It rained heavily at night but stopped around midnight. The raid began at 3.14 am and went for around three quarters of an hour. Two red flares were sent up signalling a withdrawal. All the targets were achieved and over 120 Japanese had been killed; only 3 Australians were wounded.

== Legacy ==
The Australians obtained a bag of documents from a Japanese pilot who was trying to fly out when he was killed. They contained the plans of the landings at Buna and Milne Bay. These were delivered on foot by Bill Harris to Kanga Force headquarters, enabling Australian divisions to be recalled from leave and rushed to reinforce Milne Bay. The Japanese reinforced the base at Salamaua, tying down troops that might otherwise have been used in the Kokoda Campaign.
