= George Warfe =

Australian Army officer

George Radford Warfe
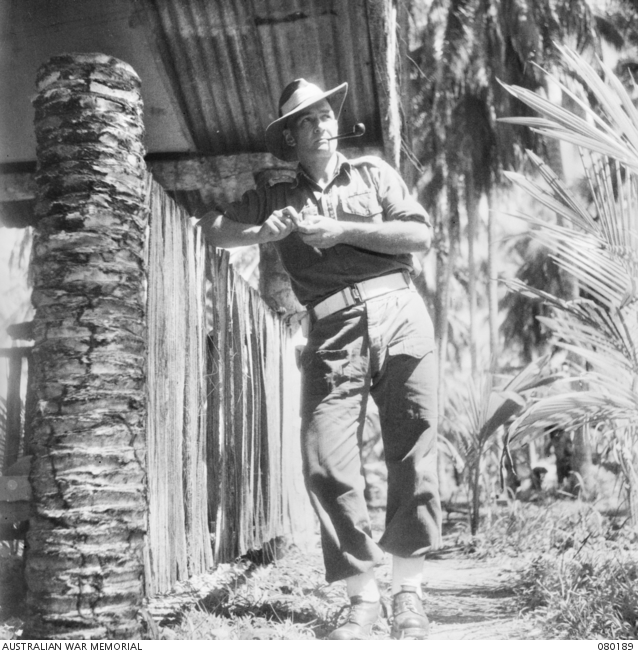
- Warfe as a lieutenant colonel, at Siar, New Guinea, July 1944
- Born: 27 July 1912; Leongatha, Victoria
- Died: 5 November 1975 (aged 63); Brighton, Victoria
- Military career
- Branch: Australian Army
- Service years: 1937–1965
- Rank: Colonel
- Commands: 58th/59th Infantry Battalion; 2/24th Infantry Battalion
- Conflicts: Second World War; North African campaign; Battle of Greece; Salamaua-Lae campaign; Finisterre Range campaign; Bougainville campaign; Battle of Tarakan; Malayan Emergency; Vietnam War
- Awards: Distinguished Service Order; Military Cross; Efficiency Decoration; Mentioned in Despatches (2)

Colonel George Radford Warfe, DSO, MC, ED (27 July 1912 – 5 November 1975) was an Australian Army officer who commanded several Australian commando and infantry units during the Second World War. He later served in staff and training roles in the post war period, which included service during the Malayan Emergency and then as a civilian advisor during the Vietnam War following his military retirement. He was active in the civil defence organisation in Victoria and in the business community before his death at the age of 63 in November 1975 from cancer.

== Early life and career ==
George Radford Warfe was born in Leongatha, Victoria, on 27 July 1912. His parents were George Henry Warfe and Ethel Charlotte Warfe (née Armstrong). He was their third child and completed his schooling at the Leongatha High School, and the Working Men's College, in Melbourne. Following graduation, Warfe gained employment in the construction and cabinet-making industries. His military career began as a member of the part-time Citizens Military Force, when he enlisted in the 29th/22nd Infantry Battalion on 20 March 1937; he was commissioned as a lieutenant on 6 February 1939. On 11 June 1938, Warfe married Ola Dysart at St Peters Church in Leongatha; the marriage ultimately ended in divorce in March 1946.

== Second World War ==
Following the outbreak of the war, Warfe joined the all volunteer 2nd Australian Imperial Force and was posted to the 2/6th Infantry Battalion, joining them on 13 October 1939. As part of the 6th Division, he deployed with them to the Middle East, and saw action with them during the first Australian ground action of the war during the Battle of Bardia in January 1941. He took part in further fighting at Tobruk and Benghazi. In March he was promoted to captain, before taking part in the short-lived Battle of Greece, which resulted in the withdrawal of Warfe's unit to Egypt, where they were rebuilt in Palestine and Syria. His leadership during the fighting in Bardia, during which he commanded a Bren carrier platoon, earned Warfe, in the words of author Garth Pratten, a "reputation for personal bravery...which remained with him throughout his service".

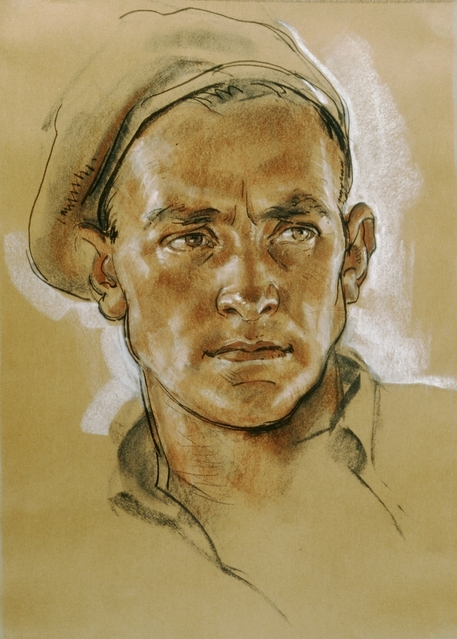
A portrait of Warfe in 1943 by official war artist Ivor Hele

After occupation duties in Syria, in early 1942 Warfe's battalion was ordered to return to Australia due to Japanese advances in the Pacific. On their way back, the battalion, along with other elements from the Australian 16th and 17th Brigades were diverted to Ceylon to undertake several months of defensive duties. On his return to Australia, Warfe was sent to the Guerilla Warfare School at Wilsons Promontory for training in unconventional warfare. After being promoted to major he assumed command of the 2/3rd Independent Company and deployed with them to Wau, Papua New Guinea in January 1943, leading them through the Salamaua–Lae campaign. Under his leadership, the commandos undertook patrols, ambushes and harassing attacks around Mubo, Missim and Bobdubi Ridge and Warfe assumed command of a composite force consisting of his commandos, along with two companies from the 58th/59th Infantry Battalion and one from the 2/7th Infantry Battalion, as the Australians advanced towards Salamaua. This force was called Warfe Force until it was broken up in August.

In September 1943, at the age of 31, Warfe was promoted to the temporary rank of lieutenant colonel and took command of the inexperienced 58th/59th Infantry Battalion. His period in command resulted in a marked improvement in the battalion's performance, as he led them through Finisterre Range campaign. He was briefly seconded to the 2/7th Cavalry Commando Regiment, but after suffering from malaria returned to the 58th/59th, commanding them in Australia and then later on Bougainville until January 1945. Pratten describes Warfe's leadership style as "aggressive, impulsive but exacting"; he often led from the front, and even took personal command of attacks down to section level.

Warfe's final command of the war was the 2/24th Infantry Battalion, which he joined in January 1945, after returning to Australia via Cairns. Part of the 9th Division, this unit was assigned to capturing Tarakan as part of the Borneo campaign. Warfe subsequently led them through the remainder of the war, including actions to secure the Japanese airfield on Tarakan. He relinquished command in February 1946. During the war, Warfe was Mentioned in Despatches twice, and decorated with both the Military Cross and Distinguished Service Order. He also later received the Efficiency Decoration.

== Post war career and later life ==
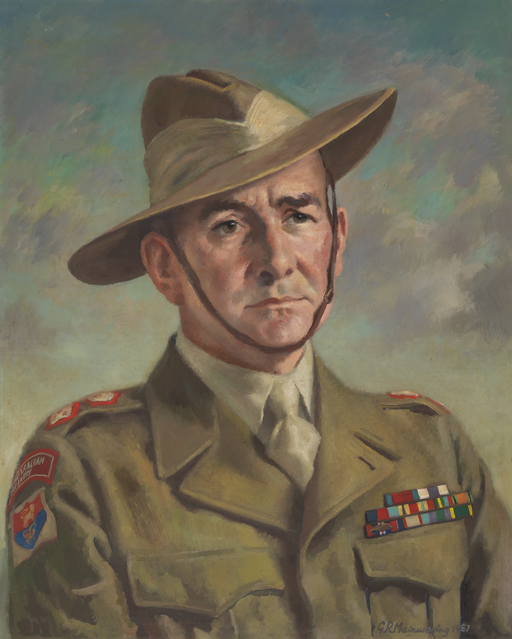
A 1957 portrait of Warfe

In the post war period, Warfe was discharged from the 2nd AIF and initially returned to civilian life and part-time soldiering. His second marriage, to Elvie Ross, took place on 15 April 1946 at the Methodist church in St Kilda. From 1948 until 1950 he commanded the 5th Battalion (Victorian Scottish Regiment) as a reservist. In July and August 1950, he deployed as an advisor during the Malayan Emergency, before taking up a regular appointment in December 1950, reverting temporarily to the rank of major. Commencing in February 1951, with the temporary rank of lieutenant colonel he commanded the 15th National Service Training Battalion for two years before undertaking study at the Australian Staff College. From January 1954, he commanded the 20th National Service Training Battalion. He deployed again to Malaya in August 1954 as an observer before returning to Australia in December that year, after which he took up a number of senior staff roles including positions at the Jungle Training Centre, where he was chief instructor, the Directorate of Military Training, Army Headquarters and headquarters 3rd Division before retiring from the Regular Army in July 1962 with the rank of colonel. He remained in the CMF for another three years, serving as commanding officer of the pentropic 1st Battalion, Royal Victoria Regiment, while employed as a training officer with a plastics company, BX Plastics.

After retirement from the military in June 1965, he worked for Clark Rubber Stores in Melbourne for a period. He also served as a senior civilian advisor with the United States mission during the Vietnam War in 1966–1967, helping establish a police training centre. In this role he was officially employed by the United States Agency for International Development, but was recruited by Colonel Ted Serong, commander of the Australian Army Training Team Vietnam. By late 1967, Warfe had been redirected to working on the Chieu Hoi program after disagreements with US advisors about his training techniques. After returning from Vietnam, Warfe later became head of the Victorian civil defence organisation, serving in the role between 1969 and 1975. His hobbies included fishing, shooting and hunting. He died on 5 November 1975 from cancer, at Brighton. He was cremated at the Springvale Crematorium and his ashes spread in the nearby botanical cemetery. His second marriage produced three sons, all of whom entered the Australian Army and reached the rank of colonel.
