= 2/8th Commando Squadron (Australia) =

- Active: 1942–1946
- Disbanded: January 1946
- Country: Australia
- Branch: Australian Army
- Type: Commando
- Role: Reconnaissance and long range patrols
- Size: 17 officers and 256 other ranks
- Part of: II Corps
- Double diamonds: White
- Engagements: Second World War: Bougainville campaign; New Britain campaign
- Battle honours: No battle honours awarded

Insignia
- Unit colour patch

The 2/8th Commando Squadron was one of 12 independent companies or commando squadrons raised by the Australian Army during the Second World War. Raised in July 1942 as the 2/8th Independent Company, the 2/8th spent the early years of the war performing garrison duties in the Northern Territory. In July 1944, the 2/8th sailed to Lae, in New Guinea from where they launched a clandestine reconnaissance operation on the island of New Britain. Later, attached to the II Corps, it participated in the Bougainville campaign, during which it was in action continuously for a period of nine months right up until the Japanese surrendered in August 1945. Following the end of hostilities, the 2/8th returned to Australia, and was disbanded at Liverpool, New South Wales in early January 1946.

== History ==
=== Formation and home duties ===
The 2/8th Independent Company was formed at Wilsons Promontory, in Victoria in July 1942. Consisting of 17 officers and 256 other ranks, the company was organised into a headquarters, three infantry platoons, with attached signals, medical and engineering sections. It undertook training at the Guerilla Warfare School that had been set up there, before being sent to northern Australia to serve in a garrison role. During this time the company was stationed at Yandina, Queensland, and then later at the Adelaide River, in the Northern Territory. In 1943, as part of a re-organisation of the independent company concept, the 2/8th were renamed the 2/8th Cavalry (Commando) Squadron, which was later shortened to the 2/8th Commando Squadron. Despite this re-organisation, however, while other commando squadrons were amalgamated together into a regimental structure, the 2/8th remained independent and when they finally deployed overseas in mid-1944 to New Guinea, they were sent as an independent unit attached to the Australian II Corps.

=== New Britain campaign ===
The squadron embarked from Townsville, Queensland, on 22 July 1944 and sailed to Lae, via Milne Bay, on board the SS Ormiston. While they were there they received an intake of 70 experienced men from some of the other commando squadrons as reinforcements. Following this, the squadron undertook a period of jungle warfare training. After a few months, in mid-September, a small detachment of the 2/8th participated in a small-scale reconnaissance operation at Jacquinot Bay on the island of New Britain, to collect intelligence in preparation for an assault by the 5th Division. As part of this operation, elements from 'C' Troop and a small detachment from 'B' Troop, from the 2/8th Commando Squadron, provided the protection force for the reconnaissance party that was put ashore from the corvette HMAS Kiama, setting up a position on the beach and conducting a number of patrols further inland. This operation was a success and later, in November, the 5th Division conducted an amphibious landing in the area unopposed.

=== Bougainville campaign ===
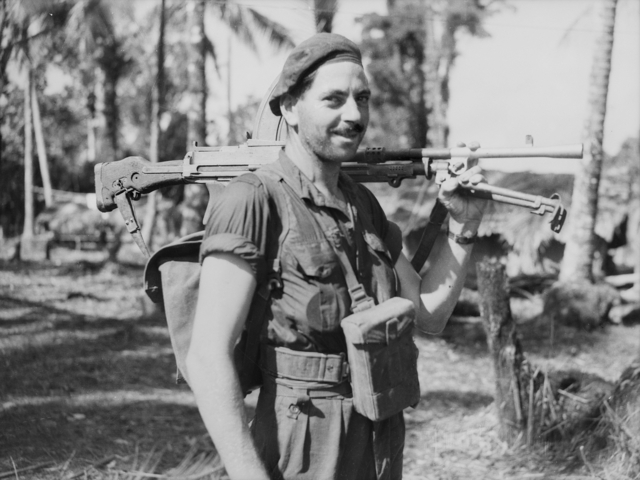
A member of the 2/8th Commando Squadron armed with a Bren light machine gun photographed after returning from a patrol in June 1945

In October, the 2/8th was transported on the troopship Aconagua to Torokina, which was the main Australian base on Bougainville, where it joined the rest of II Corps, who were concentrating in the area for the upcoming Bougainville campaign. As the campaign progressed the squadron conducted patrols from Torokina to Kuraio Mission and Amun in the northern sector on a weekly basis throughout November and into December, before handing over responsibility of the area to the 11th Brigade and being transferred to the southern sector. This was where the main battle for Bougainville was being fought, and as the 3rd Division advanced along the coast towards the Japanese base at Buin, the 2/8th was tasked to provide flank protection for the division. As a part of this, they conducted a number of reconnaissance patrols, often moving part of the way by barge, as well as conducting ambushes in order to keep the enemy off balance.

This lasted for almost nine months from December 1944 right up to the end of the war in August 1945, during which time the 2/8th was in action almost continuously. It was a long and hard campaign, and to a large extent this made up for the long periods of inactivity that the squadron had suffered while it had been garrisoned in Australia. Certainly the squadron was in the thick of it, with many of its members distinguishing themselves during this time, as evidenced by the rather large number of decorations 2/8th members earned in such a short space of time. The patrols during this time were conducted in small groups, usually no larger than two sections roughly 18–20 men, and they would last for between four and six days, although some lasted up to nine. Sometimes they would employ barges to move along the coast.

Having secured the coastal regions around the Jaba River, the squadron slowly began to move inland in order to strike into the enemy's rear, securing the many villages along the way. First they cleared to Sovele Mission, then the villages of Opai, Nihero and Morokaimoro, reaching Kilipaijino by the end of hostilities. As they went, each village taken became a patrol base and from there the squadron would gather topographical information such as track and terrain reports, and locate the enemy. Once sufficient information had been gathered and passed on to II Corps, the patrols would then attempt to ambush the enemy or try to take a prisoner. These raids were very effective in tying down the enemy and keeping them away from the 3rd Division's flanks, as they forced the Japanese to deploy troops to their rear areas, removing men from the front against which the larger infantry forces were then able to engage.

=== Disbandment ===
With the end of the war, as part of the large-scale demobilisation of Australian forces, the commando squadrons along with most of the other special forces units formed by the Australian Army were deemed surplus to requirements and the ranks of the squadron were slowly reduced as men who had earned enough points to do so were discharged, while others who did not were transferred to other units for further duties as part of the occupation forces that were being sent to Japan. By the time that the squadron returned to Australia in December 1945 with a very small frontage. Finally, on 10 January 1946, while at Liverpool, New South Wales, the 2/8th Commando Squadron was disbanded and removed from the Australian Order of Battle.

During its service, the 2/8th lost seven men killed in action and 16 men wounded. Members of the squadron received the following decorations: one Officer of the Order of the British Empire, two Distinguished Conduct Medals, four Military Medals and 12 Mentions in Despatches.

== Commanding officers ==
The following officers served as commanding officer of the 2/8th:

- Major Colin Wykeham Bayly, MC;
- Major Ernest Daniel O'Connor;
- Major Norman Issac Winning, OBE.
