= Battle of Roosevelt Ridge =

1943 World War II battle in New Guinea

- Part of World War II, Pacific War
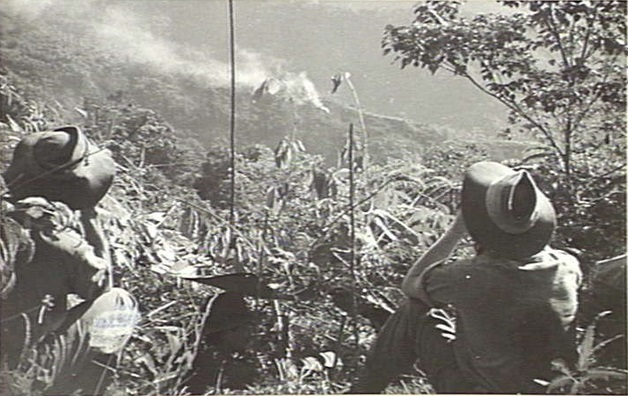
- Australian soldiers observe the fall of shot during an artillery fire mission on Roosevelt Ridge
Date	21 July – 14 August 1943
Location	Territory of New Guinea 05°30′S 141°00′E
Result	Allied victory

Belligerents
United States; Australia	Japan

Commanders and leaders
(United States) Ralph W. Coane; (United States) Ross MacKechnie; (United States) Archibald Roosevelt	(Empire of Japan) Fukuzo Kimura

Units involved
162nd Infantry Regiment; Papuan Infantry Battalion; 2/6th Field Regiment	66th Infantry Regiment; 102nd Infantry Regiment; 115th Infantry Regiment; 238th Infantry Regiment

The Battle of Roosevelt Ridge was fought between 21 July and 14 August 1943 between U.S. and Japanese forces in the Salamaua area of the Territory of New Guinea during World War II. The battle was fought in conjunction with several other actions of the Salamaua–Lae campaign. Throughout the first half of 1943, Australian forces had clashed with the Japanese around Wau and then Mubo as they had pushed the Japanese back towards Salamaua. As the campaign had developed, the Japanese had brought in reinforcements from elsewhere in New Guinea, effectively reducing their garrison, particularly around Lae. Following fighting on Lababia Ridge, the Australians had begun securing positions around Bobdubi, with a view to extending towards Mount Tambu.

With a view to driving on Salamaua from several different axes, and also to establish a port with which to relieve the aircraft and native carriers that were supplying their forces, a landing at Nassau Bay was made in early July by US troops, and they subsequently began a drive north along the coast. By mid-July, they came up against strong Japanese forces along a ridge overlooking Tambu Bay, which was later dubbed Roosevelt Ridge, after one of the U.S. battalion commanders. Over course of July and August, the U.S. 162nd Infantry Regiment made several attempts at capturing the ridge. Progress was slow, though, and this – coupled with inter-Allied service politics – strained relations between U.S. and Australian commanders before the ridge was eventually carried in mid-August.

== Background ==
In late June and early July, Allied forces were advancing towards Salamaua, having secured the airfield at Wau earlier in the year. As Australian forces were fighting around Mubo and Bobdubi, Allied planners determined the need to relieve some of the logistics burden on their aircraft by seizing Nassau Bay, which was about 15 miles (24 km) south of the Allies' ultimate objective. Over the course of several days in early July, one reinforced battalion of the 162nd Infantry Regiment, under the command of Colonel Archibald MacKechnie, made an unopposed amphibious landing at Nassau Bay. They were supported by the Australian 2/6th Infantry Battalion, which created a diversion to draw Japanese troops away from the landing beach. Elements of the Papuan Infantry Battalion (PIB) provided flank security and after the landing, the U.S. troops established a beachhead at Nassau Bay. Following the initial landing, two more battalions of the 162nd Infantry Regiment were landed at Nassau Bay along with Australian and U.S. artillery support.

The Japanese troops holding the area around area were drawn from the 3rd Battalion, 66th Infantry Regiment—under the command of Lieutenant Colonel Fukuzo Kimura—the 3rd Battalion, 102nd Infantry Regiment and a detachment of 250 men from the 115th Infantry Regiment. These forces were reinforced by elements of the 238th Infantry Regiment, which was sent to the area in mid-August as the Japanese sought to reinforce the Salamaua area by moving troops from other parts of New Guinea.

== Battle ==
Following further fighting around Mubo, the Japanese began to withdraw to avoid encirclement as the Allies advanced towards Salamaua on the coast. At the same time, in early July, an ad hoc force under Brigadier General Ralph W. Coane – the U.S. 41st Infantry Division's artillery commander – was established reporting to Major General Stanley Savige's 3rd Division, as command relationships and inter-Allied politics resulted in MacKechnie being dismissed, following disputes between Roosevelt and the commander of the 17th Brigade, Brigadier Murray Moten, regarding whether or not the U.S. troops were under Australian command. The main body of the 162nd Infantry Regiment, consisting of Lieutenant Colonel Harold Taylor's 1st Battalion and Roosevelt's 3rd Battalion, were tasked with undertaking a flanking drive along the coast north of Nassau Bay towards Logui, as part of the three-pronged Allied drive on Salamaua. Crossing the Bitoi River, the U.S. troops had advanced north along the narrow isthmus east of Lake Salus towards Tambu Bay.

Tasked with securing a beachhead around the bay, and providing artillery support to the Australians fighting around Komiatum and Bobdubi, elements of the PIB under the command of Captain Ernest Hitchcock, were pushed ahead of the U.S. force to scout the area, and around 14 July they succeeded in locating several Japanese elements around Boisi including marines and soldiers from the III Battalion of the 66th Infantry Regiment, which were orientated to defend against a landing around Tambu Bay. In addition to these forces, which numbered about 250 men, further Japanese forces which had fallen back from Mubo had also established themselves in force on a ridge overlooking the bay. This ridge, which provided good observation of Tambu Bay, allowing the Japanese to fire artillery down on to the landing beaches, was later named Roosevelt Ridge by the Americans, naming it after Major Archibald Roosevelt, the commander of the 3rd Battalion of the 162nd Infantry Regiment.

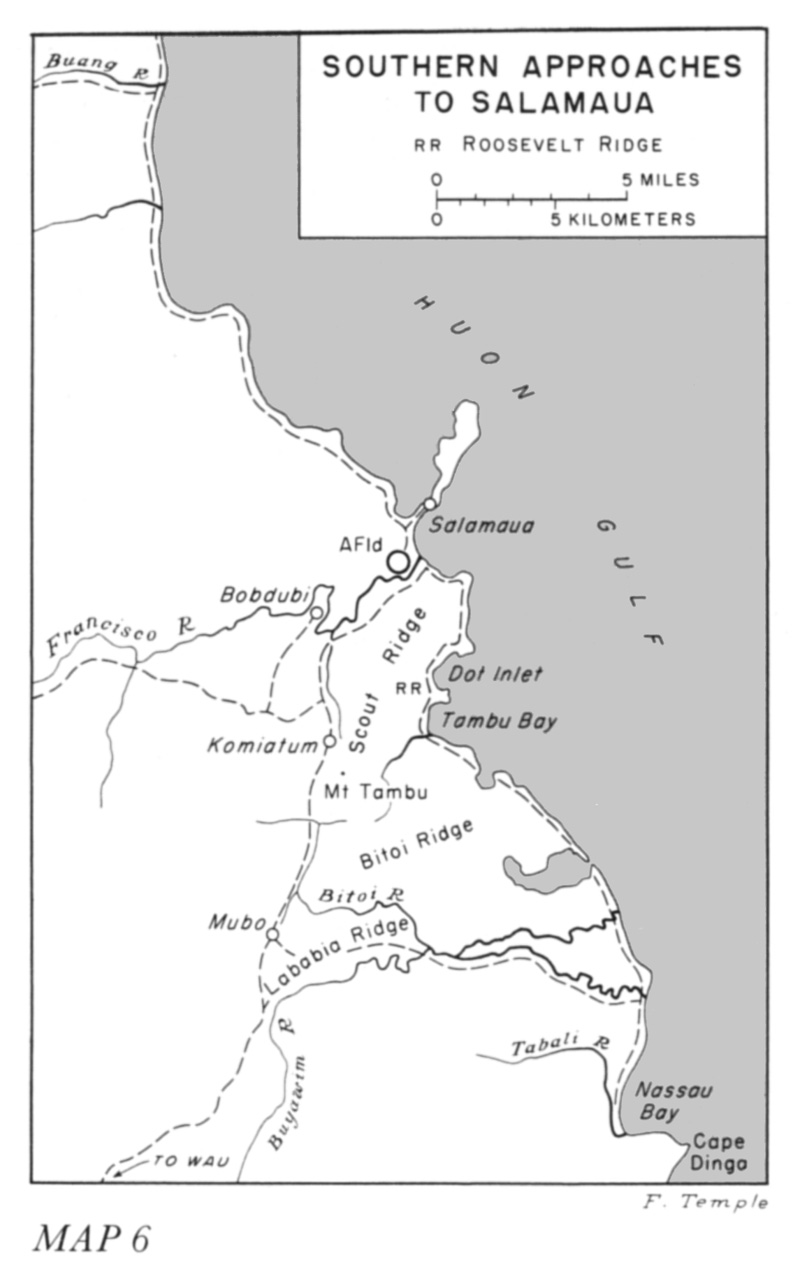
Map of key locations during the fighting around Salamaua. Roosevelt Ridge is marked as "RR".

On 15 July, a company from the 2nd Battalion of the 162nd Infantry Regiment landed on Lababia Island. Three days later the main U.S. drive on Tambu Bay commenced, with two companies striking towards the north via an inland route, while another hand-railed the coast, guided by PIB scouts. The advance was slow and on the coast, the U.S. company was held up around Lake Salu while a platoon from the PIB destroyed one of the Japanese outposts around Boisi on 20 July. The U.S. company was then able to occupy Boisi, but found itself receiving harassing fire from Roosevelt Ridge, which stretched from the sea about 1.8 kilometres (1.1 mi) to the west. The 2nd Battalion, 162nd was subsequently brought up to Tambu Bay as preparations were made for an attack on Roosevelt Ridge. The Australian divisional commander, Savige, to whom Coane Force was subordinated, suggested an attack from the west, which would allow the U.S. troops to advance downhill; however, Coane determined he would assault from the east. A platoon from the PIB scouted the area, and then this was followed by an attack by two companies: 'K' and 'I'. The Japanese defenders rolled hand grenades down the steep slope and fired mortars down on the attacking Americans. Upon cresting the hill small arms fire engaged them from several concealed positions. With this the assault was turned back. A second attempt was made later that day, but again it was defeated and two days later the two U.S. companies withdrew from the ridge. Afterwards, 'I' Company secured the western end of the ridge around Scout Ridge, which lay opposite Roosevelt Ridge, separated by a deep ravine.

In an effort to support the advancing infantry, on the night of 20/21 July two artillery pieces from the Australian 2/6th Field Regiment were landed at Tambu Bay. These were reinforced with two more guns on 24 July, while a second troop was landed the following week. Working in conjunction with the larger U.S. 105 mm pieces, these guns were later used to help reduce the Japanese defences around the Salamaua region, with aerial observation being provided by Boomerang fighters from No. 4 Squadron RAAF, while Australian forward observers were sent out from Tambu Bay to marry up with the Australian 15th and 17th Brigades further to the north-west. Japanese forces estimated that 4,000 rounds fell on their position in this period. The Japanese responded with counter-battery fire throughout late July, and an air raid by a single bomber on 24 July.

The Americans renewed their attack on Roosevelt Ridge on 27 July. A force of 100 soldiers from 'E' Company were assigned this time, using a creek line to parallel the ridge, and move up through the dense jungle. Pushing to the west and then hooking back towards a spur that led towards a small knoll on the crest, the Americans sought to find a break in the Japanese defences. Nevertheless, once again, on reaching the crest they began taking heavy fire, and although they established themselves firmly on a shoulder of ground below the ridge, they could go no further. A second company – 'F' Company – was brought up, moving in beside 'E' Company on their left, and a further assault was made on 28 July, but again this was defeated. The Americans then dug-in while the Japanese harassed them with tracer fire throughout the night. For several days, the U.S. troops made more unsuccessful attempts to win the position. In early August, the Japanese launched an uphill attack on 'I' Company on Scout Ridge. This was repelled, but they continued for several nights until the Americans took the Bald Knob feature further down Scout Ridge. In the week that followed, Japanese troops raided the US positions, severing communications.

The lack of progress concerned the Allied commanders and subsequently Douglas MacArthur replaced Coane and Roosevelt, with MacKechnie returning to take over the 162nd and Major Jack E. Morris taking over from Roosevelt. The Australian 42nd Infantry Battalion was landed at Nassau and Tambu Bays in early August and subsequently used secure positions around Davidson Ridge and Scout Ridge as part of efforts to secure Mount Tambu. Since their earlier failed attacks, the U.S. troops around Roosevelt Ridge had been patrolling the area and observing the Japanese forces, aided by the PIB. By 12 August, orders were passed for a renewed effort. The 2nd Battalion, under Major Arthur Lowe, was tasked with the main assault from its position on the southern slope of the ridge, while Morris' 3rd Battalion assaulted on their left, on the eastern part of Scout Ridge. The main assault commenced early on 13 August, but it was preceded by a patrol from the 2nd Battalion establishing an outpost about 2,000 yards (1,800 m) from Boisi. This position was attacked by the Japanese throughout the night, but the U.S. troops managed to hold their position. Heavy preparatory fires fell on Japanese position to the front and flanks, before the attack began with two companies pushing forward. In the ensuing fighting the Japanese lost 39 men killed, while the U.S. forces had 25 killed or wounded, as they penetrated the Japanese perimeter in three locations. Overnight, the Japanese attempted to reinforce the position with 200 men from the 238th Infantry Regiment, but the following morning the two U.S. companies were able to effect a link up at the western end of the ridge. The remainder of the position was then subjected to heavy fire from Bofors guns that had been dragged onto a knoll opposite the ridge, and were fired horizontally into the Japanese position, devastating the Japanese defenders and tearing up the jungle.

== Aftermath ==
Following the fighting around Roosevelt Ridge, the Allied advance on Salamaua continued. Mount Tambu was secured on 18 August, and operations in the area continued through the final week of August. The capture of Roosevelt Ridge enabled Allied artillery observers to control fires more effectively around Salamaua and in the days following they began shelling Tambu Bay heavily, while patrols were pushed forward of the ridge with a view to eventually clearing the Japanese from the Scout Ridge junction and pushing north of Roosevelt Ridge. Around the same time, the Allies launched a seaborne landing near Lae and an airborne landing at Nadzab as part of an operation to secure Lae, which Allied planners considered more important than Salamaua itself. Pressure had been maintained on Salamaua in an effort to try to draw reinforcements away from Lae; however, as the Lae operation developed, the Japanese moved about 5,000 to 6,000 troops away from Salamaua by sea, abandoning the badly bomb damaged town.

In early September, Major General Edward Milford's 5th Division headquarters took over from the 3rd Division, and the Australians launched the final effort to secure Salamaua. Bad weather hampered their efforts, but the airfield and surrounding area was eventually secured on 11 September, by Australian forces from the 15th and 29th Brigades, after a brief engagement with the Japanese rearguard. Losses in the campaign amounted to 1,083 killed or wounded for the Australians with 343 being killed and 8,100 for the Japanese, 2,722 men being killed. In addition, the U.S. 162nd lost 81 killed and 396 wounded throughout the entire campaign.
