= Ronald Hopkins =

Australian general

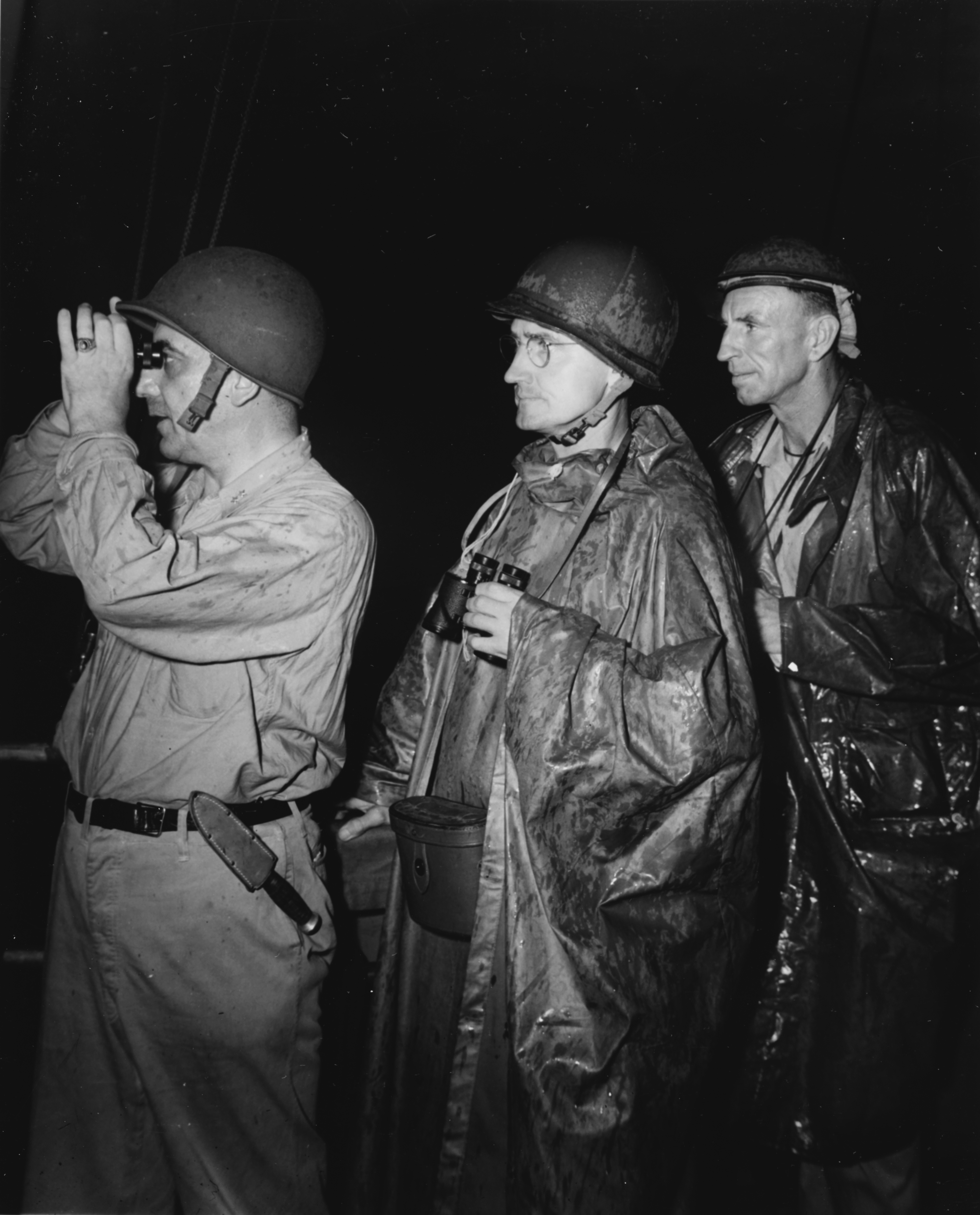
- Hopkins (right, at back), with Rear Admiral Daniel E. Barbey and Brigadier General Clarence A. Martin, at Saidor, January 1944
- Born: 24 May 1897; Stawell, Victoria, Australia
- Died: 24 November 1990 (aged 93); Walkerville, South Australia , Australia
- Military career
- Allegiance: Australia
- Branch: Australian Army
- Service years: 1915–1954
- Rank: Major General
- Service number: VX 85002
- Commands: Royal Military College, Duntroon; 34th Brigade; 7th Division Cavalry
- Conflicts: First World War; Sinai and Palestine campaign; Second World War; Mediterranean and Middle East Theatre; New Guinea campaign
- Awards: Commander of the Order of the British Empire; Legion of Merit (United States)

Major General Ronald Nicholas Lamond Hopkins CBE (24 May 1897 – 24 November 1990) was a senior officer in the Australian Army. He began his military career in 1915 when he entered the Royal Military College, Duntroon as a staff cadet and graduated as a lieutenant in the Permanent Forces in late 1917. Following this, he was deployed overseas and subsequently served in the Sinai and Palestine Campaign during the First World War. During the inter war years, Hopkins undertook a variety of regimental and staff positions in Australia, India and the United Kingdom. During the Second World War, he was promoted several times, briefly commanding the 7th Division Cavalry Regiment and was deployed to the Middle East before returning to Australia to undertook further staff positions. In this role he played a key role in organising the Australian Armoured Corps before later serving as a liaison officer to American forces taking part in the New Guinea campaign. Following the war, Hopkins commanded the 34th Brigade in Japan, before finishing his career as Commandant of the Royal Military College, Duntroon. In retirement he wrote a comprehensive history of the Royal Australian Armoured Corps before he died in 1990 at the age of 93.

== Early life and career ==
Hopkins was born in Stawell, Victoria on 24 May 1897. His father, William Hopkins, was a surgeon who was later killed on active service during the Boer War in 1900. His mother was Rose Margaret Burton (née Lamond). After attending the Melbourne Church of England Grammar School, Hopkins was appointed to the Royal Military College, Duntroon as a staff cadet in 1915 where he undertook training to become an officer in the Australian Army. Upon graduation in late 1917 he was commissioned as a lieutenant and volunteered for overseas service with the Australian Imperial Force (AIF), being assigned to the cavalry. In early 1918 he was posted to the 6th Light Horse Regiment and served with them in Palestine during the First World War. He was also seconded to the headquarters of the 2nd and 3rd Light Horse Brigades, and the Anzac Mounted Division, to serve in a staff role. Following the end of hostilities, Hopkins helped plan the return of Australian personnel from the Middle East.

Throughout the interwar period, Hopkins undertook a number of regimental and staff appointments in the Permanent Forces, including a stint as an instructor at Duntroon, before attending the Staff College at Quetta in India in 1927. Prior to his departure, in December 1926, having been promoted to captain earlier in the year, he married Nora Frances Reissmann, with whom he would subsequently have a son. He returned from India in 1928 and undertook staff work at brigade level and then at Army Headquarters in Melbourne, Victoria. Promotion to major came in 1936. The following year, in early 1937, he was sent to the United Kingdom on a fact finding mission to learn about developments in tanks and armoured warfare. He returned to Australia in April 1939 and was instrumental in organising the Australian Armoured Corps during the Second World War.

== Second World War ==
In late 1939 he was promoted to lieutenant colonel and given command of the 7th Division Cavalry Regiment. After another promotion, this time to colonel, he served briefly in the Middle East in early 1941 before being transferred back to Australia to undertake staff work attached to the 1st Armoured Division. He was later promoted to brigadier and attached to the staff of New Guinea Force and then served as a liaison officer to the American forces participating in the New Guinea campaign throughout 1943 and 1944.

For his services in these roles, in late 1943 Hopkins was invested as a Commander of the Order of the British Empire for "distinguished service in the SW Pacific". The United States government also bestowed a Legion of Merit upon him.

In September 1944, Hopkins was appointed the position as commander of the Australian Staff School. Located at Cabarlah, Queensland, the school subsequently became the Australian Staff College. Hopkins remained in this role until April 1946.

== Later life ==
Following the war, Hopkins commanded the 34th Brigade as part of the British Commonwealth Occupation Force in Japan. Promoted to major general in May 1950, he served as Deputy Chief of the General Staff before he was appointed Commandant of the Royal Military College, Duntroon in February 1951. Hopkins retired from the army on 25 May 1954.

In his retirement, Hopkins returned to Adelaide, South Australia where he served an honorary role at the University of Adelaide and helped to organise the Adelaide Festival of the Arts, serving as its chief executive officer in 1960. He also wrote the Royal Australian Armoured Corps' history, titled Australian Armour: A History of the Royal Australian Armoured Corps 1927–1972, which was published in 1978. The work received considerable praise as an in-depth study of the development of armour within the Australian Army and for its analysis of the way in which the Army utilised the Corps during the fighting in the Second World War and in Vietnam. Hopkins subsequently died on 24 November 1990, leaving behind his wife of almost 64 years, Nora, and one son.

== Notes ==
Military offices
Preceded by Major General Henry Wells	Commandant of the Royal Military College, Duntroon; 1951–1954	Succeeded by Major General Ian Campbell
