= Norman Winning =

British-Australian WWII soldier

Norman Isaac Winning
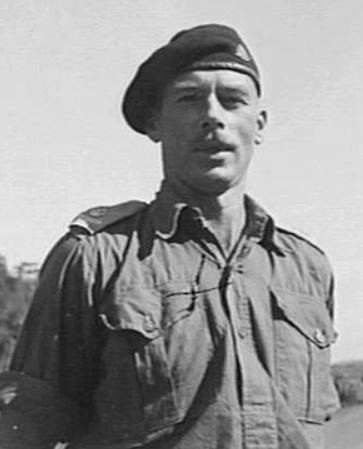
- Born: 27 May 1906
- Died: 3 December 1950 (aged 43); Subang, Java
- Burial place: Subang, Java; 6°33′27″S 107°45′28″E
- Spouse: Georgie Nell Morris Taylor
- Relatives: Isaac Winning (father); Eliza Clark Greenlees (mother)
- Military career
- Allegiance: United Kingdom
- Service years: 1940–1945
- Rank: Major
- Nickname: Red Steer
- Unit: 2/8th Commando Squadron
- Conflicts: World War II; New Guinea campaign; Salamaua Raid; Bougainville campaign
- Awards: Member of the Order of the British Empire; Mentioned in Despatches (2)
- Other work: Planter (Java), owned by Pamanoekan en Tjiasemlanden

Norman Isaac Winning, MBE (27 May 1906 – 2/3 December 1950) was a British-Australian soldier best known for leading the Salamaua Raid during World War II. He migrated to Java as a young man to work on a plantation. After the outbreak of war, he enlisted in the Australian forces in 1940 and fought against the Japanese in the New Guinea and Bougainville campaigns. After the war, he returned to Java, where he continued to manage one of the plantations. He was murdered there by anti-European rebels in 1950.

== Childhood ==
Born at Oban in Argyll on 27 May 1906, Norman Winning was the second child of Isaac Winning, a school teacher, and his wife Eliza Clark (née Greenlees). His father served in the Highland Light Infantry in World War I from 28 May 1915 to 9 August 1916, when he was discharged due to illness. Winning was educated in Troon, Ayrshire, and apprenticed at a shipping company. In 1926, at age 19, he travelled to Batavia, planning to settle in the Dutch East Indies. As a young man, Winning managed an estate owned by the Anglo-Dutch firm Pamanoekan en Tjiasemlanden in Java. (Note: The Pamanoekan en Tjiasemlanden estates in Java included 70,000 hectares (170,000 acres) of 37 estates upon which the estate managers grew variable crop land, most of which were rubber, but also included tea, coffee, cinchona, hemp, sisal, cassava, and kapok. See Hiroyoshi Kanō, Indonesian Exports, Peasant Agriculture and the World Economy, 1850–2000, NUS Press, 2008, pp. 192–193.)

== Military service ==
In September 1940, Winning travelled to Sydney to enlist in the Second Australian Imperial Force (AIF). After being accepted on 9 September, he was posted initially to the 1st Cavalry Training Squadron.

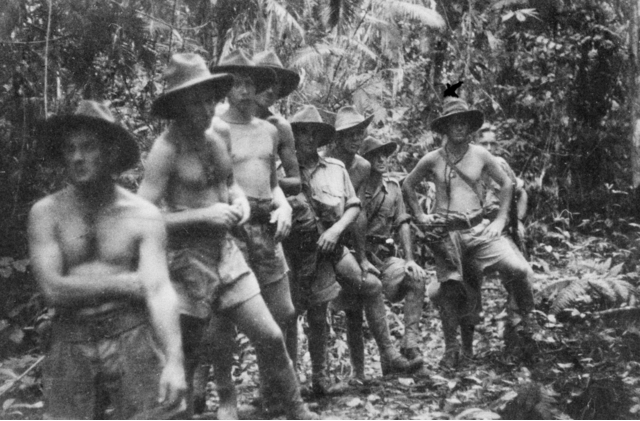
A section of 'C' platoon, 2/5th Independent Company, on an exercise walk along a jungle track, west of Bulwa in the Bulolo Valley. Captain Winning led a portion of this squadron in the successful Salamaua Raid

Upon completion of his training, he was promoted to temporary warrant officer, and, in December 1941, was commissioned lieutenant and transferred to the 4th Independent Company. Promoted captain in March 1942, he left for Port Moresby in April with the 2/5th Independent Company, which was later renamed the 2/5th Cavalry (Commando) Squadron. The company flew to Wau, New Guinea that May and, as part of the Kanga Force, began patrolling the tracks leading into the Bulolo Valley, from which they could harass the Japanese. Winning was widely respected among his men, earning the nickname The Red Steer. The Red Steer is also the name given to the wild brush fires that blaze across the outback, a useful tool against squatters and intruders.

He led the Salamaua Raid, the first offensive land action against the Japanese in World War II, on 29 June 1942, in which at least 100 Japanese soldiers were killed; the raid also captured Japanese equipment and documents. Described as a copybook action for its diligent scouting, meticulous planning and audacious, Winning, then a captain, led multi-pronged attack against a Japanese force 10 times the attackers' strength. The 2/5th returned to Australia in May 1943 for additional training, and in November Winning transferred to the 2/4th Commando Squadron as second-in-command. The unit deployed near Finschhafen, in New Guinea, for operations against the Japanese on the Huon Peninsula. After a brief trip to Australia in February 1944, he was sent to the Far Eastern Liaison Office in April; on 8 July he was promoted to major and given command of the 2/8th Commando Squadron. They trained at Lae in New Guinea before deploying to Bougainville. The unit engaged the Japanese several times near the Jaba River and in the area north of the Buin Road. Following the war, he left the army on 26 September 1945, and was appointed a Member of the Order of the British Empire in 1947 for his services in Bougainville.

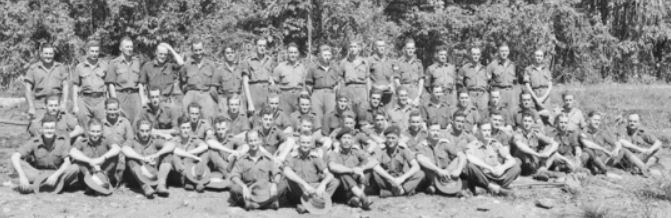
Outdoor group portrait of 53 personnel of the 2/8th Commando Squadron: Major Winning was the officer in charge.

He resumed his work as a planter, managing an estate for P&T after the war. On 2 or 3 December 1950, he was shot by terrorists while driving from the plantation he managed to Subang.

== Personal life ==
He married Georgie Nell Morris Taylor, and the couple had no children. His wife remained in New South Wales while he served in the AIF. His wife survived him.
