= Ralph W. Coane =

United States Army soldier

- Born: October 17, 1891; Oakland, California, US
- Died: November 19, 1977 (aged 86)
- Burial place: Pacific Crest Cemetery, Redondo Beach, California
- Military career
- Allegiance: United States
- Branch: United States Army
- Service years: 1918-1946
- Rank: Brigadier General
- Units: 40th Infantry Division; 41st Infantry Division
- Commands: 41st Infantry Division
- Conflicts: World War I; World War II; Battle of Roosevelt Ridge

Ralph W. Coane (October 17, 1891 - November 19, 1977) was an officer of the United States Army. He is best known for being the artillery commander of the 41st Infantry Division during World War II.

== Military career ==
=== Early Career and World War I ===
Born in Oakland, California, Coane enlisted in the United States Army on January 5, 1918, and reported to duty at Officers' Training School at Camp Kearny, California. He received his commission as a second lieutenant on May 28, 1918. He was initially assigned to the 115th Ammunition Train, part of the 40th Infantry Division. In August 1918 he deployed to France during World War I, until October of that year in which he was transferred to the 143rd Field Artillery Regiment stationed out of Camp de Souge. On January 18, 1919, Coane was honorably discharged from active service and appointed a second lieutenant to the California National Guard as a field artillery officer.

=== World War II ===
On March 17, 1942, months after the onset of World War II, then Colonel Coane was temporarily promoted to Brigadier General, and assigned as artillery commander of 41st Infantry Division, based out of Fort Lewis. He would deploy with the unit to the Pacific Theater, participating in the Battle of Roosevelt Ridge with the 162nd Infantry Regiment. Coane commanded an ad-hoc force during the battle, known as the "Coane Force", and fought under Australian Army General Stanley Savige of the 3rd Division. On July 17, the Coane's forces moved forward from Nassau Bay, and secured the southern headland of Tambu Bay, establishing a supply base. Then under his command, his unit launched a series of artillery attacks which resulted on the August 13 capture of high ground at Roosevelt Ridge, Scout Ridge, and Mount Tambu, which overlooked Tambu Bay and Dot Inlet.

In July 1944, due to wounds received in action, he returned to the United States and was hospitalized Hoff General Hospital in Santa Barbara, California. His final assignment would see him command the 14th Headquarters and Headquarters Detachment, Special Troops, Fourth Army at Fort Polk, Louisiana.

== Personal life ==
Ralph married his wife Grace in 1915, while the two attended Stanford University. In 1977, at age 86, Coane died and was buried at Redondo Beach, Los Angeles County, California.
