= Battle of Bobdubi =

Part of World War II

- Part of World War II, Pacific War
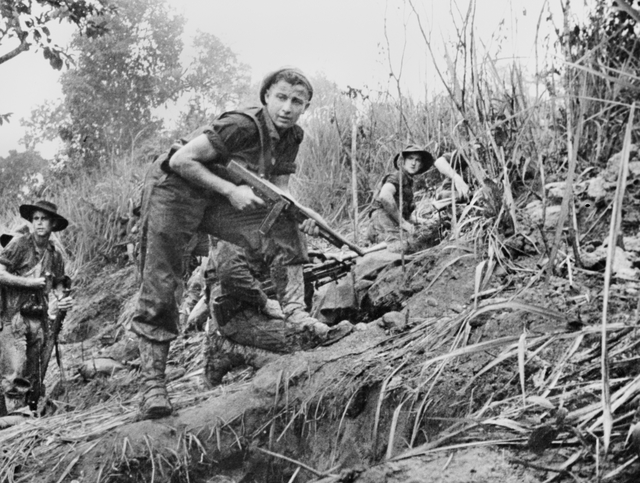
- Australians from the 2/3rd Independent Company around Timbered Knoll, 29 July 1943
Date	22 April 1943 – 19 August 1943
Location	Territory of New Guinea 05°30′S 141°00′E
Result	Allied victory

Belligerents
Australia	Japan

Commanders and leaders
(Australia) Stanley Savige (Australia) Murray Moten	(Empire of Japan) Hidemitsu Nakano

Units involved
3rd Division: 15th Brigade; 17th Brigade	51st Division: 80th Infantry Regiment; 66th Infantry Regiment; 115th Infantry Regiment

The Battle of Bobdubi was a series of actions fought in the Salamaua area of the Territory of New Guinea between Australian and Japanese forces which took place from 22 April to 19 August 1943, during World War II. Part of the Allied advance on Salamaua, the battle was fought in conjunction with several other actions in the region as the Allies attempted to draw Japanese attention away from Lae, where they launched seaborne landings in mid-September 1943 in conjunction with airborne landings around Nadzab. The initial phase of the fighting around Bobdubi was characterised mainly by small unit harassment and reconnaissance operations, while the second phase saw the capture of a number of Japanese defensive positions in locations dubbed "Old Vickers", "Timbered Knoll", and the "Coconuts".

== Background ==
In late January 1943, during the Battle of Wau a Japanese attempt to capture the vital airfield around Wau had been repelled. In the process, the last Japanese attempt to capture Port Moresby was turned back. In the aftermath, the Australian force – consisting mainly of the 17th Brigade under the command of Brigadier Murray Moten – had advanced into the area surrounding Wau and towards Mubo. As elements of the 17th Brigade were engaged in fighting around Mubo, Major George Warfe's 2/3rd Independent Company moved around the Japanese flanks to Missim, from where they began a guerilla campaign and reconnaissance operations along the Komiatum Track to harass the Japanese, in support of Major General Stanley Savige's 3rd Division's campaign around Salamaua. At this time, Japanese troops from the 80th Infantry Regiment, which formed part of Lieutenant General Hidemitsu Nakano's 51st Division, were positioned around Bobdubi Ridge, which dominated the Missim area, situated to the north of Komiatum. Elements of the 66th and 115th Infantry Regiments were also in the area over the course of the fighting.

== Battle ==
Between 22 April and 29 May 1943, the Australian 2/7th Infantry Battalion, at the end of a long and tenuous supply line, attacked the southern extremity of the Japanese lines, the Mubo area, at features known to the Allies as "The Pimple" and "Green Hill" during the Battle of Mubo. While the 2/7th made little progress, they provided a diversion for the 2/3rd Independent Company, which advanced in an arc and raided Japanese positions at Bobdubi Ridge, inflicting severe losses. Later in May, the 2/7th repelled a number of strong Japanese counter-attacks.

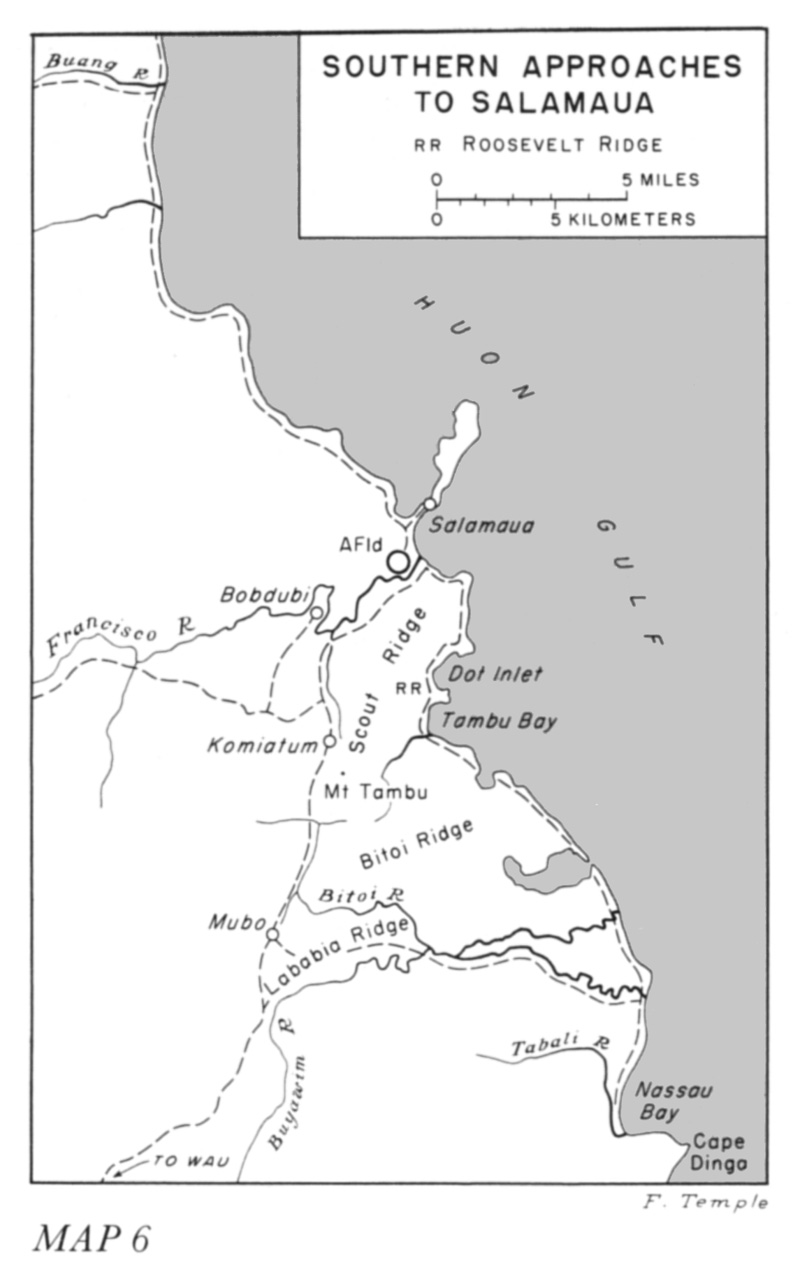
Map showing key locations in the Salamaua-Lae region

At the same time as the fighting around Mubo the Australian 24th Infantry Battalion, which had been defending the Wampit Valley in an effort to prevent Japanese movement into the area from Bulolo, detached several platoons to reinforce the 2/3rd Independent Company. During the month of May, they were heavily engaged in patrolling the 3rd Division's northern flank, around the Markham River, and the area around Missim. One patrol succeeded in reaching the mouth of the Bituang River, to the north of Salamaua. On 11 May, the 2/3rd sent patrols to Bobdubi Ridge and subsequently occupied it, having found that the Japanese had abandoned it; long range exchanges of fire with Japanese troops on Komiatum Ridge followed, and a full scale Japanese attack followed, supported with artillery, pushing the commandos from the ridge on 14 May. This was followed by heavy air attacks on Australian positions on 15 May. Elsewhere, in an effort to defend the approaches to Wau, troops from the 2/7th Infantry established themselves in a defensive position around Lababia Ridge, which was located about 2 kilometres (1.2 mi) south-west of Mubo, and throughout late June, the Australians fought a defensive action along the ridge.

Between 30 June and 19 August, the Australian 15th Brigade cleared Bobdubi Ridge, in order to relieve pressure on the forces around Mubo, and gain control of the Komiatum Track, thereby cutting off the Japanese forces in front of Mubo and disrupting Japanese efforts to resupply them. This was undertaken in conjunction with the landing of US troops around Nassau Bay, while the 17th Bridge would launch a final effort around Mubo. The operation was opened in late June with an assault by the inexperienced 58th/59th Infantry Battalion, and included hand-to-hand combat; meanwhile, on the northern Australian flank the 24th Infantry Battalion set up ambushes and clashed with small groups of Japanese along the Malolo Track. During the initial attack on Bobdubi, the Japanese forces holding it equated to about one company from the 115th Infantry Regiment, but over the course of several days, these were reinforced by about 200 troops from the 66th Infantry Regiment, and then a battalion of the 80th Infantry, which was hurriedly dispatched from Lae.

In early July, the 2/3rd Independent Company launched an attack against "Ambush Knoll", a feature which controlled Bobdubi Ridge, and captured it. By capturing the knoll, the 2/3rd threatened the Japanese supply lines to Mubo and Salamaua and because of this it forced them to launch a number of fierce counterattacks in an attempt to retake it. These counterattacks occurred over the course of the following three days and four nights, however, the platoon from the 2/3rd, consisting of only 52 men, managed to hold the knoll. Later in the month, the 2/3rd attacked the Japanese around the "Timbered Knoll", launching a successful flanking attack which pushed the Japanese off the position.

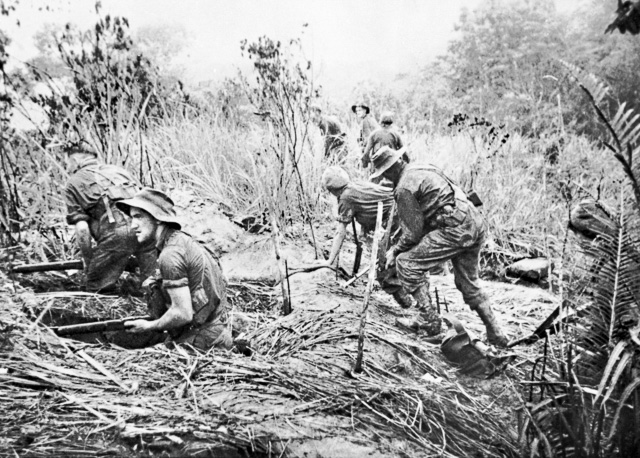
Troops from the Australian 2/3rd Independent Company take up position in weapon pits during an attack on Timbered Knoll, north of Orodubi, between Mubo and Salamaua, 29 July 1943.

At the end of July, the 2/6th Infantry Battalion put in a company-level attack on the Japanese flank and managed to secure one of the feature's in front of Ambush Knoll. Meanwhile, the 58th/59th attacked around a position dubbed "Old Vickers". Heavily supported with indirect fire and machine-guns, the attack was successful and, the Japanese abandoned Bobdubi Ridge. The fighting over the six weeks to that point had been heavy, with Japanese losses at the hands of the 15th Brigade being estimated at around 400 killed, against 46 killed and 152 wounded for the Australians. In mid-August, the Australians continued the attack. On 14 August, heavy aerial bombing reduced Japanese positions around "Coconut Ridge" – consisting of three positions dubbed "North Coconut", "Central Coconut" and "South Coconut" – which was followed by an attack by the 2/7th Infantry Battalion; advancing up a steep slope, they nevertheless managed to gain a foothold around the northern end of the ridge and that night, the Japanese withdrew from the southern end.

Meanwhile, two days later, the 2/6th Infantry exploited further, attacking and taking Komiatum Ridge with two companies, after a heavy artillery preparation. The result of this was the encirclement of Japanese troops on Mount Tambu, their supply routes between Komiatum and Davidson Ridge having been cut. In an effort to prevent a break out between Komiatum and Bobdubi, the Australian divisional commander, Savige, ordered a follow-up attack by the 15th Brigade towards the Salamaua Track. On 17 August, the 2/3rd Independent Company secured the junction of the Bobdubi–Salamaua Track, and then held it against heavy Japanese counter-attacks, which were finally defeated on 19 August.

== Aftermath ==
Following actions around Bobdubi, further fighting in the Salamaua area followed. As the Japanese divisional commander, Nakano, ordered the withdrawal of his forces from around Komiatum and Bobdubi to a final defensive line to the rear, the Australian advance towards the coast, in conjunction with the drive north along the coast by the US 162nd Infantry Regiment, pushed the Japanese further to the north-east. In mid-August, the 29th Brigade, which had landed at Tambu Bay, relieved the 17th, as the 5th Division headquarters took over from the 3rd Division. Advancing towards Salamaua in an effort to draw reinforcements away from Lae, where a seaborne landing was planned for mid-September in conjunction with an airborne landing at Nadzab to capture the town in a pincer movement, the Australian and US forces continued to clash with the Japanese for the next fortnight. The Japanese resisted heavily, but nevertheless, the Francisco River was crossed on 21 August, and in the first week of September, the 42nd Infantry Battalion captured "Charlie Hill". Bad weather held up the Allied advance, and finally, Nakano received orders from the 18th Army commander, Hatazō Adachi, to withdraw back from the Salamaua region to reinforce Lae, transferring between 5,000 and 6,000 troops by barge. The town of Salamaua and its airfield was eventually taken by the Allies on 11 September.

The fighting around Bobdubi took place in two phases and as a result after the war, the Australian Army issued two battle honours to units that participated in the battle: "Bobdubi I" for the initial phase between 22 April 1943 and 29 May 1943 and "Bobdubi II" for actions between 30 June 1943 and 19 August 1943. The units chosen to receive these battle honours were from the 15th and 17th Brigades, which were under the command of the 3rd Division.
