= Nassau Bay, Papua New Guinea =

Bay in eastern Papua New Guinea

Coordinates: 7°17′S 147°09′E

Nassau Bay is a bay to the south of Salamaua, Morobe Province in the Huon Gulf.

The United States Army's 162nd Infantry Regiment landed at Nassau Bay on the night of the 29–30 June 1943, to set up a beachhead and supply dump for the future push towards recapturing Salamaua.
