= Jack Pimm =

Australian rules footballer (1920–2016)

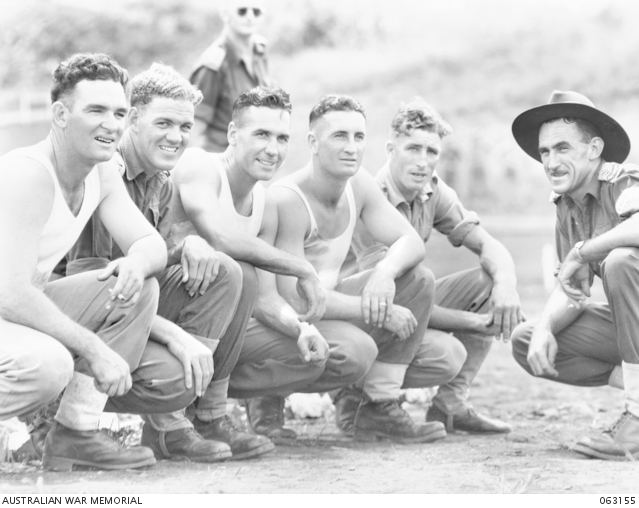
- VFL and VFA players who were members of 15th Australian Infantry Brigade. Pimm is second from left.
- Born: John Huggett Pimm; 7 October 1920; Avoca, Victoria
- Died: 27 February 2016 (aged 95); East Ivanhoe, Victoria
- Other name: "Jack"
- Military career
- Allegiance: Australia
- Branch: Australian Army
- Service years: 1943-1946
- Rank: Lieutenant
- Unit: 58th/59th Infantry Battalion
- Conflicts: Second World War; South West Pacific theatre; New Guinea Campaign; Bougainville Campaign
- Awards: Military Cross
Australian rules football career
Personal information
- Original team: Wattle Glen
- Height: 183 cm (6 ft 0 in)
- Weight: 82 kg (181 lb)
- Position: Centre half-forward
Playing career^{1}
Years	Club	Games (Goals)
1940–1950	Collingwood	58 (112)
- ^{1} Playing statistics correct to the end of 1950.
Career highlights
- Leading goalkicker Collingwood 1949

John Huggett Pimm, MC (7 October 1920 – 27 February 2016) was an Australian rules footballer who played with Collingwood in the Victorian Football League (VFL).

Pimm grew up in what was then a Collingwood recruitment zone, around Wattle Glen, Victoria. He attended Melbourne High School and watched Collingwood training sessions from an early age.

Pimm, a centre half-forward, played five senior games as well as games in the seconds for Collingwood in the 1940 VFL season but did not play again until 1946, the lengthy interruption being due to his World War II military service.

Pimm saw active military service in the Australian Army achieving the rank of Lieutenant, serving mostly with the 15th Australian Infantry Brigade, primarily as a member of the 58th/59th Battalion and also with the 57th/60th Battalion. He saw fighting first in Papua New Guinea. Later, on Bougainville Island he was awarded the Military Cross "for inspired and gallant service". At war's end he was transferred to the 11th Brigade for a time, prior to repatriation from the South West Pacific and discharge from the Army.

Pimm resumed his VFL senior playing career with Collingwood on 10 June 1946, two weeks after his discharge, and a day on which Collingwood won. He played fourteen games that year, including a semi final and preliminary final. Over his VFL playing career for Collingwood (1940, 1946–1950) Pimm played 58 senior games, 34 of which were wins. Pimm kicked 112 goals, including 34 goals in 1949; enough to top Collingwood's goal-kicking that season. Of the twenty nine games he played at Victoria Park, Collingwood's home ground from 1892 until 1999, twenty four were won by Collingwood. Pimm was made a Life Member at Collingwood in 1953.
