= Tabali River =

River in Papua New Guinea

Location
- Country: Papua New Guinea
- Region: Morobe Province

Physical characteristics
- Source
  - location: Papua New Guinea
- Mouth
  - location: Huon Gulf at Nassau Bay, west of Cape Dinga

The Tabali River is a river located in Morobe Province, Papua New Guinea. The river flows into the Huon Gulf at Nassau Bay, west of Cape Dinga.
