= 2/3rd Commando Squadron (Australia) =

- Active: 1941–1946
- Country: Australia
- Branch: Australian Army
- Type: Commando
- Role: Recon and long range patrol
- Size: 273 men all ranks
- Part of: 2/7th Cavalry (Commando) Regiment
- Double diamonds: Light blue
- Engagements: World War II: New Guinea Campaign; Borneo Campaign

Commanders
- First Commander: Lieutenant Colonel Donald Matheson
- Last Commander: Major George Warfe

Insignia
- Unit colour patch

The 2/3rd Commando Squadron was one of twelve independent or commando companies and squadrons formed by the Australian Army for service during World War II. Raised in October 1941 as the 2/3rd Independent Company, it served in New Caledonia and New Guinea before being amalgamated into the 2/7th Cavalry Commando Regiment and adopting the name 2/3rd Commando Squadron in 1943. After this, the squadron did not see action again until 1945, when it participated in the Borneo campaign. Throughout the course of the war, the 2/3rd lost 69 members killed in action. No battle honours were awarded to the unit, although it participated in a number of notable engagements in these campaigns and its members received numerous decorations for their service. Following the end of hostilities in the Pacific, the unit was disbanded in early 1946, upon their return to Australia.

== History ==
Formed in October 1941 as the 2/3rd Independent Company, the unit undertook training at the Guerrilla Warfare Camp at Foster, Victoria. After completing training, the 2/3rd was transported north to Katherine, Northern Territory, where it carried out various garrison duties. During this time there was considerable debate within the high command of the Australian Army about the role that the 2/3rd and the other independent companies would fill. However, following Japan's entry into World War II after the attack on Pearl Harbor and British forces in Malaya, it was decided to use the independent companies in the islands to the north of Australia, where it was necessary to establish outposts that could warn of the approach of the Japanese. With this in mind, the 2/3rd Independent Company was sent to New Caledonia in December 1941 as a gesture of goodwill to the Free French and in order to defend against a possible Japanese attack.

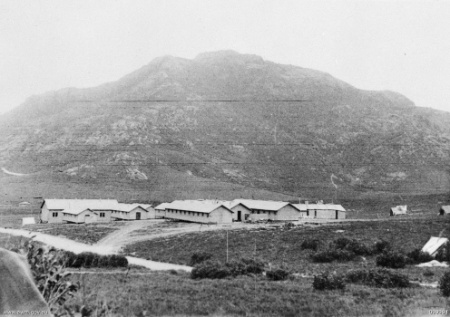
View over Foster training camp, Guerrilla Warfare School, towards Mount Oberon. Mount Oberon was used by members of the independent companies as part of their physical training course. (AWM photo)

The deployment of the 2/3rd to New Caledonia was only a temporary measure, however, until the US Army sent Taskforce 6814 (Note: This taskforce consisted of: the 132nd Infantry Regiment, 182nd Infantry Regiment, 754th Tank Battalion, 180th Field Artillery Regiment (155 mm) less 2nd Battalion, 2nd Battalion of 123rd Field Artillery Regiment (155 mm), 70th Coast Artillery Regiment (AA, Mobile) less Band, 3 Bn & 3 Platoon of Bty G of 244th Coast Artillery Regiment (155 mm) and 67th Pursuit Squadron.) to reinforce the island, arriving in March 1942. Impressed with the 2/3rd and the training methods that they utilised, permission was sought by the American commander to retain the 2/3rd on the island in order to retrain his division. However, due to the requirements of the defence of Australia at the time, the company was withdrawn in early August 1942, although their commanding officer, Major George Matheson, stayed on to provide assistance and was promoted to lieutenant colonel.

After its return to Australia, the company spent the next six months training and undertaking garrison duties before sailing for New Guinea in mid-February 1943. Under the command of Major George Warfe, the 2/3rd arrived in Port Moresby, although they did not stay there very long as they were quickly flown to Wau. From there they were used to harass and pursue the Japanese towards Mubo. Following this, the 2/3rd moved to Missim, from where they began a guerilla campaign along the Komiatum Track, in support of the 3rd Division’s campaign around Salamaua.

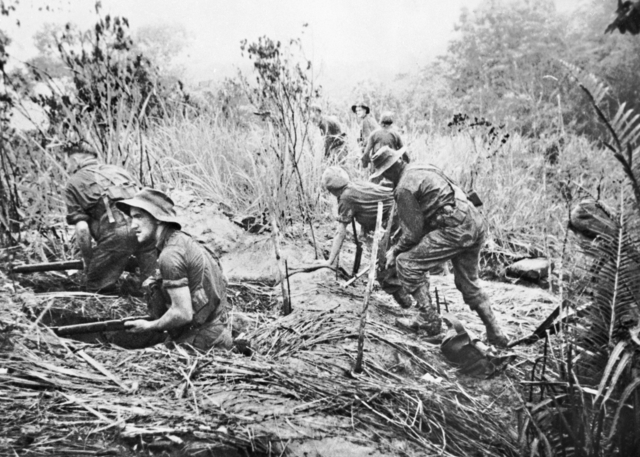
Members of the 2/3rd Independent Company during an attack on the Timbered Knoll position in July 1943

As a part of this campaign, the 2/3rd patrolled deep into Japanese held territory, setting ambushes and gathering intelligence. They also made a number of attacks against Japanese positions, in order to harass them to keep them off balance and as such defend the 3rd Division's flanks. The most notable of these attacks came in May 1943 when a strengthened platoon launched an attack against Ambush Knoll, a feature which controlled Bobdubi Ridge, and captured it. By capturing the knoll, the 2/3rd threatened the Japanese supply lines to Mubo and Salamaua and because of this it forced them to launch a number of fierce counterattacks in an attempt to retake it. These counterattacks occurred over the course of the following three days and four nights, however, the platoon from the 2/3rd, consisting of only fifty-two men, managed to hold the knoll.

During its time in New Guinea, the 2/3rd suffered heavy casualties and as a result after the fall of Salamaua in September, they were withdrawn and brought back to Australia. They had performed quite well in the circumstances, however, and were credited with having killed 969 Japanese. Against this, the 2/3rd had suffered 65 killed, 119 wounded, and 226 men evacuated for medical reasons.

Upon its return to Australia, the 2/3rd was reformed on the Atherton Tablelands, Queensland. During this time, a reorganisation of the independent companies by the Australian Army was undertaken as part of a wider reorganisation of the Army as a whole and as a part of this reorganisation the 2/3rd was integrated into the 2/7th Cavalry Commando Regiment, along with the 2/5th and the 2/6th Independent Companies. In October, the 2/3rd Independent Company was renamed the 2/3rd Cavalry Commando Squadron, although later this name was simplified to just 2/3rd Commando Squadron. To a large extent, however, despite being placed under a regimental structure, the squadron continued to remain largely independent in terms of tactics and training.

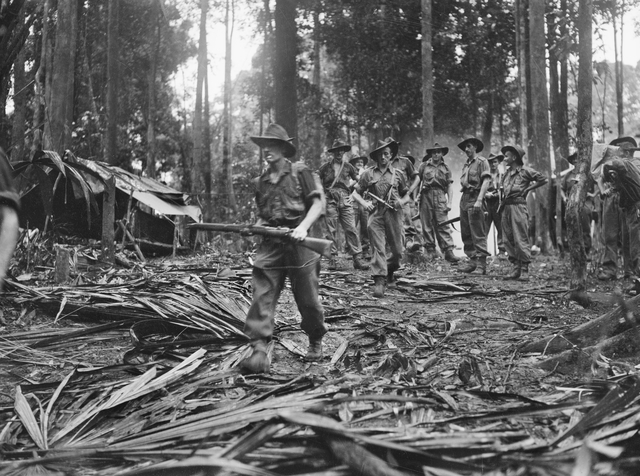
Members of the 2/3rd Commando Squadron departing on a patrol at Balikpapan

For the remainder of 1943 until early 1945 there was a lull Australia's involvement in the war in the Pacific, and the 2/3rd remained on the Atherton Tablelands, where it trained and conducted exercises with the 7th Division. The squadron's final campaign of the war came in 1945, when attached to the 7th Division, the 2/3rd participated in the landing at Balikpapan. Landing on Green Beach on 1 July 1945 along with the rest of 2/7th Cavalry (Commando) Regiment, the squadron moved off along Vasey Highway with the objective of capturing Seppinggang airfield, acting in support of the 2/5th Commando Squadron. The following day, however, they came under heavy mortar fire from the Japanese on Lady Schofield Knoll which prevented them from capturing the airfield until 3 July. After that, on 4 July, a number of troops were transferred to the 2/9th Infantry Battalion in order to patrol the area around Penadjam, with the rest of the 2/3rd continuing on to Seppinggang. Offensive operations ceased on 27 July, and with Japan's surrender in August, the war came to a close.

Following the end of hostilities in the Pacific, the 2/3rd was slowly reduced in strength as members were posted out to other units for occupation duties, before the remainder of the unit returned to Australia at the end of December. In early 1946, at Chermside camp, in Brisbane, Queensland, the 2/3rd Commando Squadron was finally disbanded. A total of 69 members of the squadron were killed or died on active service during the war, and its members received the following decorations: four Military Crosses, four Distinguished Conduct Medals, six Military Medals, one British Empire Medal and four Mentions in Despatches.

== Commanding officers ==
- Lieutenant Colonel Donald George Melbourne Matheson.
- Major Peter Lumsden Tancred.
- Major George Radford Warfe. (Note: Warfe later achieved the rank of colonel and after the war went on to command the Victorian Scottish Regiment.)

== Notes ==
Footnotes

Citations
