= HMAS Echuca =

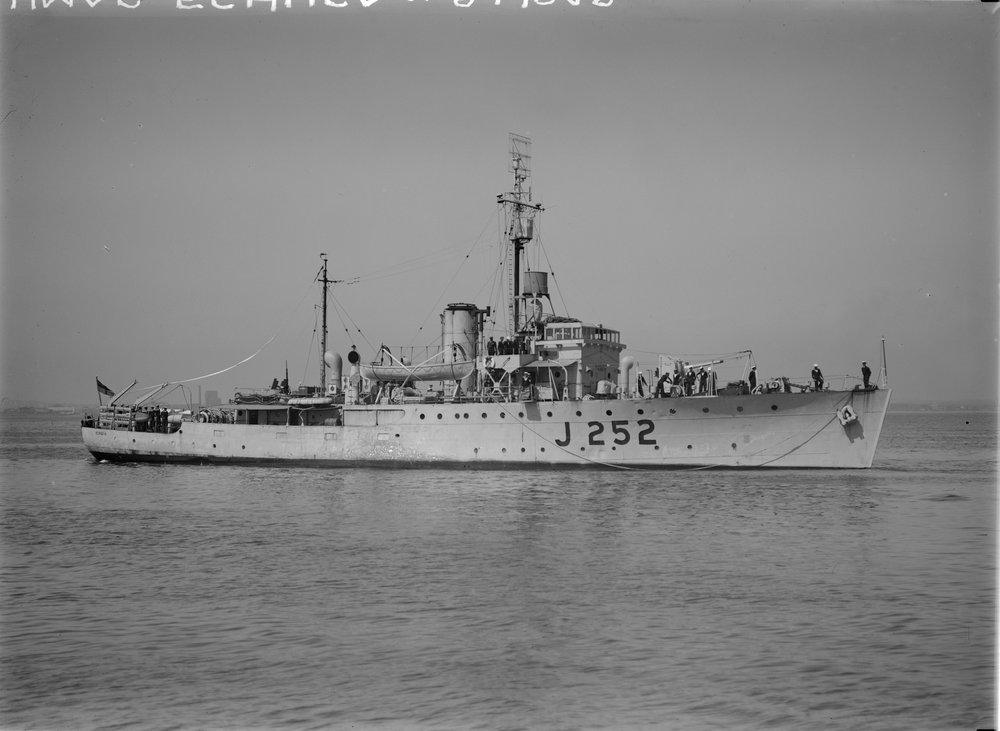

History

Australia
- Namesake: Town of Echuca, Victoria
- Builder: HMA Naval Dockyard
- Laid down: 22 February 1941
- Launched: 17 January 1942
- Commissioned: 7 September 1942
- Decommissioned: August 1946
- Recommissioned: January 1947
- Decommissioned: 28 June 1948
- Honours and awards: Battle honours: Pacific 1944–44; New Guinea 1943–44
- Fate: Transferred to RNZN
- Badge

New Zealand
- Acquired: 5 March 1952
- Commissioned: May 1952
- Decommissioned: April 1953 into reserve
- Fate: Sold for scrap 11 April 1967

General characteristics
- Class & type: Bathurst-class corvette
- Displacement: 650 tons standard; 1,025 tons full load
- Length: 186 ft (57 m)
- Beam: 31 ft (9.4 m)
- Draught: 8.5 ft (2.6 m)
- Propulsion: triple expansion engine, 2 shafts, 2,000 ihp
- Speed: 15 knots (28 km/h; 17 mph) at 1,750 hp
- Complement: 85
- Armament: 1 × 4 inch Mk XIX gun; 3 × 20 mm Oerlikons; Machine guns; Depth charges chutes and throwers

HMAS Echuca (J252/M252), named for the town of Echuca, Victoria, was one of 60 Bathurst-class corvettes constructed during World War II, and one of 36 initially manned and commissioned by the Royal Australian Navy (RAN).

== Design and construction ==
In 1938, the Australian Commonwealth Naval Board (ACNB) identified the need for a general purpose 'local defence vessel' capable of both anti-submarine and mine-warfare duties, while easy to construct and operate. The vessel was initially envisaged as having a displacement of approximately 500 tons, a speed of at least 10 knots (19 km/h; 12 mph), and a range of 2,000 nautical miles (3,700 km; 2,300 mi) The opportunity to build a prototype in the place of a cancelled Bar-class boom defence vessel saw the proposed design increased to a 680-ton vessel, with a 15.5 knots (28.7 km/h; 17.8 mph) top speed, and a range of 2,850 nautical miles (5,280 km; 3,280 mi), armed with a 4-inch gun, equipped with asdic, and able to fitted with either depth charges or minesweeping equipment depending on the planned operations: although closer in size to a sloop than a local defence vessel, the resulting increased capabilities were accepted due to advantages over British-designed mine warfare and anti-submarine vessels. Construction of the prototype HMAS Kangaroo did not go ahead, but the plans were retained. The need for locally built 'all-rounder' vessels at the start of World War II saw the "Australian Minesweepers" (designated as such to hide their anti-submarine capability, but popularly referred to as "corvettes") approved in September 1939, with 60 constructed during the course of the war: 36 (including Echuca) ordered by the RAN, 20 ordered by the British Admiralty but manned and commissioned as RAN vessels, and 4 for the Royal Indian Navy.

Echuca was laid down by HMA Naval Dockyard at Williamstown, Victoria on 22 February 1941. She was launched on 17 January 1942 by Lady Royle, wife of First Naval Member Sir Guy Royle, and commissioned into the RAN on 7 September 1942.

== Operational history ==
=== World War II ===
Echuca’s initial role was as an anti-submarine patrol and convoy escort vessel along the eastern Australia coast and in New Guinea waters. She stayed in this role from October 1942 until August 1944, when she was ordered to Darwin and attached to the United States Seventh Fleet's Survey Group. She performed survey duties until the end of World War II, when she was refitted with minesweeping gear in Brisbane and assigned to the 20th Minesweeping Flotilla. The Flotilla was responsible for clearing minefields set up in the waters of Australia, New Guinea, New Britain, and the Solomon Islands.

Echuca received the battle honours "Pacific 1942–44" and "New Guinea 1943–44" for her wartime service.

Echuca was paid off into Reserve in August 1946, but recommissioned in January 1947 for mine clearance work in the Great Barrier Reef. The corvette performed this duty until August 1947, and in November 1947 towed the decommissioned corvette HMAS Inverell to Sydney. Echuca was decommissioned again in Fremantle on 29 June 1948. At the end of April 1952, the corvette was sailed to Melbourne.

=== RNZN service ===
On 5 March 1952, Echuca and three other Bathurst-class corvettes (HMA Ships Inverell, Kiama, and Stawell) were transferred to the Royal New Zealand Navy (RNZN). She was commissioned into the RNZN in May 1952, and received the prefix HMNZS.

The corvette remained in service with the RNZN until 1967, although from 1953 she was classified as being in reserve. She was sold to Pacific Scrap Limited of Auckland for scrapping on 11 April 1967.
