= 2/5th Commando Squadron (Australia) =

2/5th Commando Company
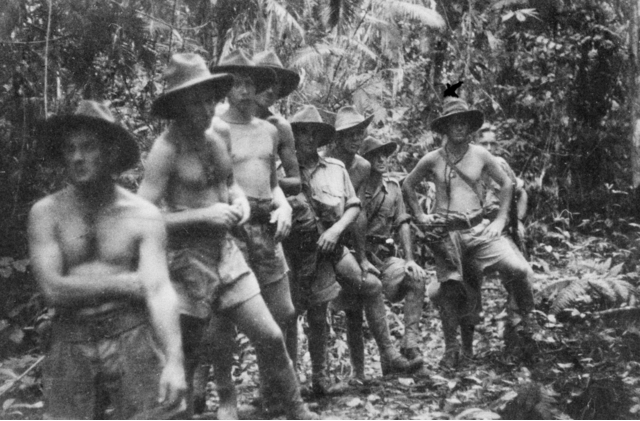
- A section of 'C' platoon, 2/5th Independent Company, on an exercise walk along a jungle track, west of Bulwa in the Bulolo Valley.
- Active: 1942–1946
- Country: Australia
- Branch: Australian Army
- Type: Commando
- Role: Recon and long-range patrol
- Size: 273 all ranks
- Part of: 2/7th Cavalry (Commando) Regiment (HQ), attached to Australian 7th Division
- Nickname: Double Black
- Double diamonds: Black
- Engagements: World War II: New Guinea campaign; Borneo campaign

Insignia
- Unit colour patch

The 2/5th Commando Squadron was one of twelve independent companies and or commando squadrons of the Australian Army formed for service during World War II. Initially formed in 1942 as the "2/5th Independent Company", the 2/5th served in New Guinea, taking part in a major commando raid on Salamaua in June 1942. It was later withdrawn from New Guinea and reformed as the "2/5th Cavalry (Commando) Squadron", as part of the 2/7th Cavalry (Commando) Regiment which saw service in Borneo in 1945. It was disbanded in early 1946.

== History ==
=== Formation 1942 ===
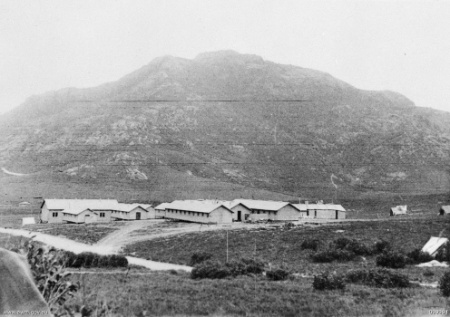
2/5th's training camp in Tidal River, Victoria. Mount Oberon in the background was used by the company as part of its physical training course. (AWM photo)

In February 1941, Lieutenant Colonel J.C. Mawhood, a British officer, arrived in Australia and established No. 7 Infantry Training Centre at Wilsons Promontory, Victoria, Australia. As a part of its wartime expansion, the Australian Army had originally intended to field four Independent Companies, trained to a high standard in irregular warfare for use in the sabotage and reconnaissance roles. The terrain surrounding the centre consisted of a number of high rugged mountains, swift streams and swamps and it was felt that this was ideal for training soldiers in the art of irregular warfare. The health and training of the trainees was affected by the long periods of wet weather; however, despite the hardships experienced by the trainees by October 1941, three companies (1st, 2nd and 3rd Independent Companies) had already been trained.

Following Japan's entry into the war, the training centre re-opened as the Guerilla Warfare School. In January 1942, volunteers from all branches of the Army were called for and began assembling at the school, where they were put through a rigorous six-week course. In March 1942, once sufficient numbers had completed the course, the "2/5th Independent Company" was formed. At the time, the company consisted of 17 officers and 256 other ranks and was commanded by a major. It was divided into a company headquarters, with attached engineer, signals, transport and medical sections and three infantry platoons, each under a captain, each consisting of three sections that were under the command of a lieutenant.

=== New Guinea 1942–43 ===
On 13 April 1942 the company departed Townsville, Queensland, on the SS Taroona commanded by Major Thomas Kneen and was "very heavily armed". They arrived in Port Moresby, New Guinea on the 17th, during an air raid. They were deployed on 24 May to Wau, in a valley high inland from Lae and Salamaua. They were part of Kanga Force commanded by the controversial Colonel Norman Fleay, that consisted of the 2/5th, the New Guinea Volunteer Rifles (NGVR) and a platoon from 1st Independent Company and were to observe the Japanese at Lae and Salamaua. They were the first Allied force in World War II to be flown into action as a complete unit. Despite appalling conditions, enduring soaking rain, pests, diseases, and a lack of supplies such as food and medication, they harassed the Japanese in the area from the Markham to the Bitol Rivers for one year.

==== The Salamaua Raid ====
On 29 June 1942, the company launched a raid on a Japanese aerodrome at Salamaua, the first Allied attack on Japanese land forces anywhere. The raid was commanded by Captain Norman Winning, after initial careful reconnaissance by Sergeant Jim McAdam's NGVR scouts. Winning planned the assault with Captain Douglas Umphelby of the NGVR. The raiders, formed into several parties, with mortar support, set out from Butu in the early afternoon of 28 June. Heavy rain fell throughout the march, but it later cleared and early the following morning, the Australians attacked various areas between the Francisco River and Kela Point, destroying buildings, vehicles and a bridge, and killing about 100 Japanese before returning to Butu for the loss of only three Australians wounded. During the raid, a Japanese pilot, attempting to reach his aircraft, ran into the commandos and was killed. Important documents were found in a satchel carried by the pilot and these were sent to Kanga Force headquarters for analysis.

An attack on Heath's Plantation, the following night was not as successful as the element of surprise had been lost, and Kneen was killed in action. Following the raids, the Japanese heavily shelled Kela Point and attacked the tracks leading away from Salamaua by air in an effort to cut off the raiders' withdrawal routes. The Australians withdrew from Butu to their main camp, as the Japanese sent patrols of up to 90 men into the foothills; they subsequently found the camp at Butu and destroyed it. They also sent reinforcements from their garrison at Lae to Kela village.

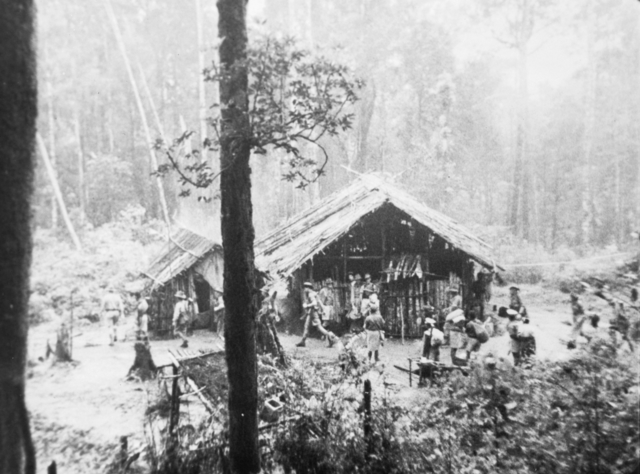
Troops from B Platoon, 2/5 Independent Company leave camp to conduct a raid. (AWM Photo)

==== July 1942 until April 1943 ====
In the months following the raid on Salamaua, the 2/5th continued patrol operations around the Huon Gulf. When it became apparent that the Japanese were concentrating their forces at Mubu with the intention of launching an attack against Wau, the 2/5th launched another raid on 1 October 1942, consisting of a party of 60 men, again under Winning's command. During the approach march, Lieutenant Bill Drysdale was wounded by a booby trap, which alerted the nearby Japanese. The Japanese defenders came out to meet the raid, driving the outnumbered Australians back. Heavy fighting followed, and while attempting to cover the withdrawal, one of the raiders, Sergeant William O'Neill, killed up to 16 Japanese with sub-machine-gun fire. The Japanese were later estimated to have lost 50 killed, including the company commander; nevertheless, the raid was broken up and the Australians spent several days regrouping.

Soon after the Mubo raid, the unit moved to the nearby Markham valley on long range patrols. In January 1943, the 2/5th with the 2/7th flew to Wau airfield which was under Japanese attack. They went straight into action leaving the aircraft under fire, and repelled the Japanese invasion. Finally, in February 1943, exhausted from starvation, illness and injury, and beset by atrocious weather, they were withdrawn for rest, with the majority of the sick congregating at Wau, before being transported to Edie Creek at Kaindi to recuperate. On 20 March 1943, the 2/5th was ordered to return to the Markham area to conduct patrols around the Snake River and to prepare defensive positions. Throughout April they undertook active patrols with the 2/6th Battalion and established observation posts. By 21 April the lead elements of the 24th Battalion began arriving at Bulolo as the 3rd Division moved forward and prepared to relieve the forward Australian troops, including the 2/5th, which was subsequently withdrawn to Port Moresby after almost a year of continuous operations.

=== Reorganisation 1943–44 ===
The 2/5th departed New Guinea for Australia on the troopship Duntroon on 13 May 1943. It was sent to the Jungle Warfare Centre at Canungra, Queensland to refit and regroup. In August it moved to Wongabel on the Atherton Tablelands where it was reformed as the "2/5th Cavalry (Commando) Squadron". Following a reorganisation of the Australian Army's independent companies, the 2/5th was incorporated with the 2/3rd and 2/6th Independent Companies into the 2/7th Cavalry (Commando) Regiment, which was attached to the 7th Division and was to act as the administrative headquarters to the squadron during the next phase of the conflict. Later, the designation of "cavalry" was dropped and the unit simply referred to as "2/5th Commando Squadron". Throughout the remainder of 1943 and all of 1944 the 2/5th trained with the rest of the 7th Division, conducting a number of complex brigade and divisional level exercises, but it did not go into action again until almost the end of the war.

=== Borneo campaign 1945 and disbandment ===
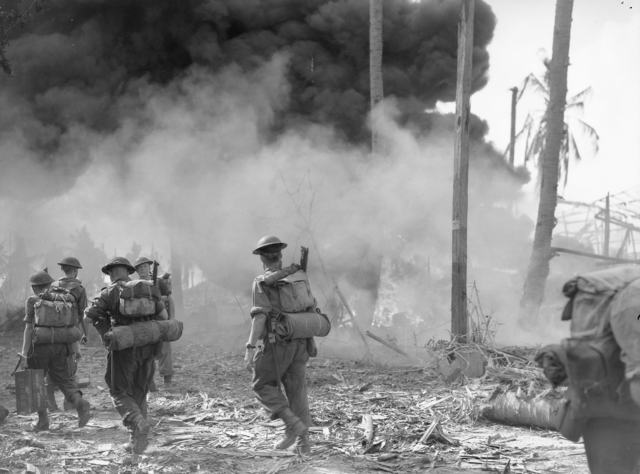
Members of the 7th Division at Balikpapan

The final campaign that the 2/5th Commando Squadron took part in came in mid-1945, when as a part of the 2/7th Cavalry (Commando) Regiment, attached to the Australian 7th Division, when it participated in the Borneo campaign as part of the "Oboe" operations. The squadron landed on Green Beach on Balikpapan on the first day of the battle and moved up the Vasey highway into the nearby hills, occupying first Lady Shofield's and then Jade and Jelly hills. By 7 July, it had occupied the Sepinggang airfield. It then moved into the hills between the airfield and Batakan Besar. On 25 July, the squadron was transferred to support the 25th Brigade in its advance along Milford Highway. Patrols continued up until the end of the war, when it was then used to conduct mobbing up operations around the island.

At the end of December the 2/5th left Borneo for Australia, and in early 1946, in Chermside camp, Brisbane, the squadron was disbanded. During the course of the war, the 2/5th lost 24 men killed. For their actions during the New Guinea and Borneo campaigns, Sergeants Malcolm Bishop (later colonel) and Bill O'Neill were awarded Military Medals for rescuing the badly injured Drysdale under heavy fire during the raid on Mubu. Other Military Medal recipients were Sergeant Walter Hulcup, and Privates Charles Beitz and Thomas Robertson, while Lieutenant (later Captain) William Chaffey received the American Bronze Star Medal, and Sergeants Richard Osborne McLaughlin and William O'Neill the Distinguished Conduct Medal. The squadron's Medical Officer, Captain Raymond Allsopp, was awarded a Mention in Despatches for providing life saving medical attention during an ambush at Balikpapan in July 1945. This award was upgraded to a Star of Gallantry in 2017, following a review by the Defence Honours and Awards Appeals Tribunal.

== Commanding officers ==
The following officers commanded the 2/5th:

- Major Ian Edward Kerr;
- Major Thomas Paul Kneen;
- Major Patrick Sellar Lang; and
- Captain John Thurgate Taylor.
