= Mageri Point =

Peninsula in Papua New Guinea

Mageri Point is a peninsula, located in Morobe Province, Papua New Guinea.
