= Bitoi River =

River in Papua New Guinea

Coordinates: 7°14′S 147°04′E

Location
- Country: Papua New Guinea
- Region: Morobe Province

Physical characteristics
- Source
  - location: Papua New Guinea
- Mouth
  - location: Huon Gulf south of Salamaua

The Bitoi River is a river located in Morobe Province, Papua New Guinea. The river flows into the Huon Gulf south of Salamaua.
