= Kuraio Mission =

- Village
- Country: Papua New Guinea

Kuraio Mission is a village on the west coast of Bougainville Island, Papua New Guinea.
