= 2/7th Cavalry Commando Regiment (Australia) =

Commando regiment raised by the Australian Army

- Active: 1940–1945
- Country: Australia
- Branch: Australian Army
- Role: Commando
- Size: ~800–900 personnel all ranks
- Part of: 7th Division
- Engagements: World War II: North African campaign; New Guinea campaign; Borneo campaign

Commanders
- Notable commanders: Ronald Hopkins

Insignia
- Unit colour patch

The 2/7th Cavalry (Commando) Regiment was one of three commando regiments raised by the Australian Army for service during World War II. It was originally raised as the 7th Division Cavalry Regiment in 1940 and in this guise it served in North Africa and the Middle East at the beginning of the war, before it was brought back to Australia and sent to New Guinea in late 1942 to serve against the Japanese. In mid-1943 the Australian high command decided to disband the divisional cavalry regiments and use their headquarters elements to administer the independent companies that had been raised earlier in the war. In the process the 7th Division Cavalry Regiment disbanded its squadrons, gave up their vehicles and changed its name to the 2/7th Cavalry (Commando) Regiment, as it became the administrative headquarters for the 2/3rd, 2/5th and 2/6th Commando Squadrons.

== History ==
The 2/7th Cavalry (Commando) Regiment was formed in April 1940 as the 7th Division Cavalry Regiment, under the command of Lieutenant Colonel Ronald Hopkins. Consisting of a headquarters squadron and three sabre squadrons designated 'A' through 'C', the regiment drew personnel from New South Wales for its headquarters squadron, while its sabre squadrons came from Victoria, South Australia and Queensland. In May, the regiment provided two squadrons – 'A' and 'B' – for the newly formed 8th Divisional Cavalry Regiment, and as a result raised new squadrons from personnel recruited in New South Wales and Queensland.

Part of the Second Australian Imperial Force that was raised for overseas service, originally the regiment was conceived as an armoured reconnaissance regiment attached to the 7th Division and, after undertaking initial training around Cowra, New South Wales, it was sent to the Middle East theatre in December 1940.

After arriving in Egypt in early 1941, the regiment conducted further training was used mainly in a defensive role. Equipped with Vickers light tanks and Bren carriers, it carried out garrison duties around the Suez Canal, before being moved to Cyprus following the fall of Greece. In August 1941, the regiment was moved to Syria where it formed part of the Allied occupation forces.

In March 1942, the regiment returned to Australia, following the entry of Japan into the war. After a period of training and defensive duties in Queensland, in September 1942 the regiment was sent to New Guinea to help defend Port Moresby as the Japanese continued their advance along the Kokoda Track. Upon the 2/7th's arrival, the decision was made for the regiment to leave its Bren carriers in Port Moresby and as the campaign began to turn in the favour of the Australians the 2/7th were flown to Popondetta to reinforce the units there in December. For over a month they took part in the fighting around Huggins Roadblock along the Sananada Track serving in the dismounted role as infantry.

Finally on 21 January 1943 the Australians linked up with US forces and the Sanananda village fell. Shortly afterwards the regiment was withdrawn back to Dobodura airstrip from where they were transported back to Australia. The casualties that the regiment had suffered during the fighting were very high with 54 men killed and 67 wounded. On top of this over 200 men had contracted malaria and three had died from scrub typhus. Among those that were killed was the regiment's commanding officer, Lieutenant Colonel Edgar Logan. During its time in the Middle East and in New Guinea, the regiment lost 59 men killed or died on active service and 67 wounded. Four members of the regiment were decorated with the Military Medal.

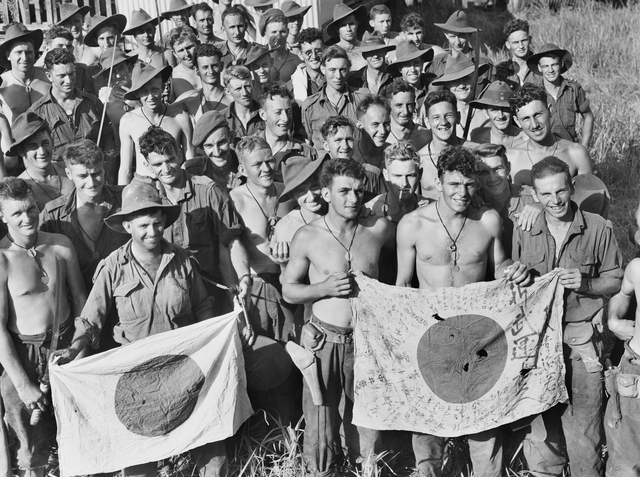
Members of the 2/6th display Japanese flags captured during the Battle of Kaiapit

Following its return to Australia, the regiment began reorganising on the Atherton Tablelands in Queensland. At this time the Australian Army was undergoing a period of restructuring as its strategic focus shifted towards concentrating upon fighting the war against the Japanese in the Pacific. As a part of this restructuring it was decided that there was no need for divisional cavalry regiments, however, it was decided that the independent companies should be grouped together under a regimental structure, and in response the divisional cavalry regiments were broken up and their headquarters elements were used to administer the commando squadrons. Three such units were formed at this time, with the 7th Division Cavalry Regiment adopting the title of the 2/7th Cavalry (Commando) Regiment in April 1943. The regiment's subordinate squadrons were: the 2/3rd, 2/5th and 2/6th Commando Squadrons, however, in terms of tactics and training the individual squadrons retained their independence.

Although the 2/6th Commando Squadron was deployed to New Guinea in late 1943 and into early 1944, the regiment as a whole did not see action again until late in the war when they landed along with the rest of the 7th Division Balikpapan, Borneo, in July 1945 in one of the final campaigns of the war. Landing on Green Beach on 1 July 1945, the regiment's three squadrons participated in the advance along the Vasey Highway, undertaking the flank protection and reconnaissance roles before contributing to the mopping up effort as the war came to a close. Following the end of hostilities, the regiment was disbanded.

== Commanding officers ==
- Lieutenant Colonel Ronald Hopkins; (Note: Hopkins later achieved the rank of major general.)
- Lieutenant Colonel Edgar Parker Logan; (Note: Killed in action 19 December 1942.)
- Lieutenant Colonel Charles Moses.

== Battle honours ==
- World War II: North Africa 1941, South-West Pacific 1942–43, South-West Pacific 1945, Buna–Gona, Sanananda Road, Borneo, Balikpapan, Milford Highway.

== Notes ==
Footnotes

Citations
