= Hidemitsu Nakano =

Japanese general

- 中野 英光
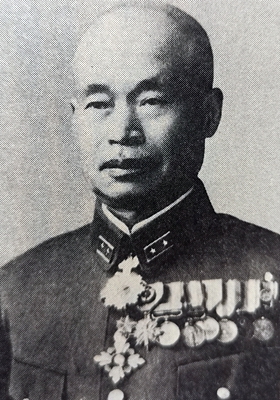
- Born: April 18, 1890; Saga Prefecture, Japan
- Died: March 19, 1982 (aged 91)
- Education: Imperial Japanese Army Academy; Army Staff College
- Military career
- Allegiance: Empire of Japan
- Branch: Imperial Japanese Army
- Service years: 1912–1945
- Rank: Lieutenant General
- Units: IJA 23rd Infantry Regiment; Imperial Japanese Army General Staff Office; Kwantung Army; IJA 63rd Infantry Regiment; Jirin Special Agency; Manchukuo Imperial Army; North China Area Army; IJA 21st Army; Japanese Southern China Area Army
- Commands: IJA 13th Infantry Regiment; IJA 29th Infantry Brigade; IJA 51st Division
- Conflicts: Second Sino-Japanese War; Battle of Wuhan; World War II; New Guinea campaign; Battle of the Bismarck Sea; Salamaua–Lae campaign

Hidemitsu Nakano (中野英光, Nakano Hidemitsu; April 18, 1890 – March 19, 1982) was a general in the Imperial Japanese Army, commanding Japanese ground forces in the Southwest Pacific during the closing months of the war.

== Biography ==
Nakano was born in Saga Prefecture, where his father was a former samurai retainer to Saga Domain. He graduated from the 24th class of the Imperial Japanese Army Academy in May 1912 and initially served with the IJA 23rd Infantry Regiment. In November 1920, Nakano graduated from the 32nd class of the Army Staff College and was assigned to the Imperial Japanese Army General Staff Office. In May 1926, he was transferred to the staff of the Kwantung Army, and was posted to the Harbin Special Agency, a military intelligence section based in Harbin in Manchuria. He subsequently served as a battalion commander in the IJA 63rd Infantry Regiment. Nakano rose to the position of bureau head of the Jirin Special Agency in 1931, and military advisor to the Manchukuo Imperial Army in 1935. In August 1936, he was promoted to colonel and in August 1937 was assigned to the staff of the North China Area Army, where he was based in Jinan and was again in charge of military intelligence.

In March 1938, Nakano was appointed commander of the IJA 13th Infantry Regiment, which was active in combat operations in central China (including the Battle of Wuhan in the Second Sino-Japanese War. In February 1939, he was transferred to the staff of the IJA 21st Army and was appointed bureau head of military intelligence in Guangzhou. In March 1939, Nakano was promoted to major general. In February 1940, his position came under the administrative control of the newly formed Japanese Southern China Area Army. Nakano briefly served as commander of the IJA 29th Infantry Brigade, and in December 1940 returned to the Kwantung Army as Chief Military Advisor to the Imperial Manchukuo Army. In October 1941, he was promoted to lieutenant general.

In November 1941, Nakano was given command of the IJA 51st Division, which was a garrison force based at Guangzhou at the time. He would remain in command of the division until after the end of the war. The following year, in November 1942, the 51st Division was moved to Rabaul and in February 1943 to New Guinea where they were allocated to the Eighteenth Army in the Lae–Salamaua area. However, the division suffered from severe casualties in the Battle of the Bismarck Sea, losing many men and much of its equipment. The division subsequently took part in the Salamaua–Lae campaign and other combat operations throughout 1943–45, fighting against Australian and United States forces. Nakano vowed to make a last stand at Salamaua, burning the division's colors and stating that no one would be taken prisoner. However, Imperial General Headquarters issued a direct order to Nakano not to make a suicidal stand, but to withdraw if he could not hold the town. Nakano made a fighting retreat from Salamaua, but lost half his men retreating through the Finisterre Mountains towards Madang. Nakano survived the war, and died in Japan in 1982.
