= 58th Battalion (Australia) =

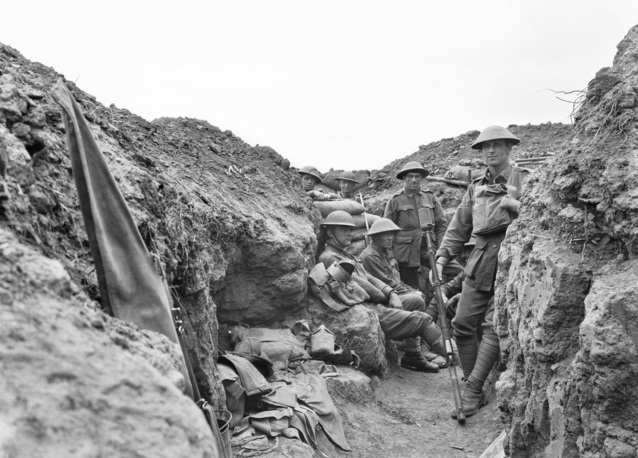
- 58th Battalion troops at Morlancourt, 4 July 1918
- Active: 1916–1919; 1921–1942
- Country: Australia
- Branch: Australian Army
- Type: Infantry
- Role: Line infantry
- Size: ~800–1,000 men (Note: During World War I, the approved establishment of an Australian infantry battalion was 1,023 men. By the beginning of World War II, the normal size of an Australian infantry battalion had fallen to 910 men all ranks. Later still, following the reorganisation of the 3rd Division along the jungle establishment, the size dropped to 803 men all ranks.)
- Part of: 15th Brigade
- Colours: Purple alongside red
- Engagements: World War I: Western Front; World War II

Insignia
- Unit colour patch

The 58th Battalion was an infantry battalion of the Australian Army. It was raised in 1916 for overseas service during World War I and saw action on the Western Front from June 1916 until the end of the war. Following the end of hostilities it was disbanded in 1919; however, in 1921 the battalion was re-raised as part of the part-time Citizens Force (later known as the Militia) and remained in existence until 1942 when it was amalgamated with the 59th Battalion to form the 58th/59th Battalion. That battalion subsequently saw active service in the Pacific against the Japanese during World War II before being disbanded in 1946. After the war, the battalion was re-formed as an amalgamated Citizens Military Force unit, the 58th/32nd Battalion, which was based in Melbourne. This unit remained in existence until 1960 when it was subsumed into the Royal Victoria Regiment.

== History ==
=== World War I ===
The 58th Battalion was originally raised as a unit of the First Australian Imperial Force (AIF) in Egypt on 17 February 1916 for service in World War I as part of the expansion of the AIF that took place at that time. In order to spread the experience gained through the AIF's involvement in the Gallipoli Campaign, the new units were formed by taking experienced men from other battalions and joining them with new recruits that were sent from Australia. The 58th Battalion drew its experienced personnel from the 6th Battalion while its new recruits came from Victoria. Together with the 57th, 59th and 60th Battalions, the 58th formed part of the 15th Brigade, which was attached to the 5th Australian Division. At this time it was decided that the Australian infantry divisions would be transferred to Europe to fight in the trenches along the Western Front in France and Belgium. As the 5th Division was still forming it did not depart until later in the year and the 58th Battalion arrived in France on 23 June 1916.

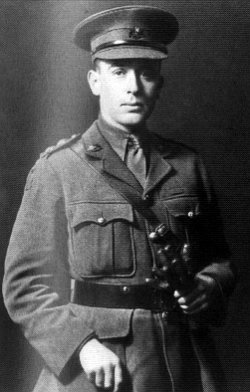
Rupert Vance "Mick" Moon, the 58th Battalion's sole Victoria Cross recipient

The battalion experienced its first taste of fighting on the Western Front in July when it was involved in the Battle of Fromelles, being in reserve and providing medical stretcher parties. The reserve force, about half of the battalion, was committed at the climax of the battle and lost a third of its strength to machine gun fire. During early 1917, in an effort to shorten their lines of communication, the Germans withdrew to prepared positions of the Hindenburg Line; a brief advance followed as the Allies followed them up. During this phase of the war the 58th Battalion was not committed to any major attacks, but it did play a defensive role at the end of the Second Battle of Bullecourt in May, holding the ground that the Australians had gained earlier. Later in the year, the 5th Division was transferred to the Ypres sector in Belgium, and on 26 September 1917, the 58th was committed to the fighting around Polygon Wood.

Early in 1918, the Germans launched a large-scale offensive on the Western Front known as the Spring Offensive after the collapse of Tsarist Russia allowed them to transfer a large number of troops from the Eastern Front. As the Allies were pushed back, the Australian divisions were moved south in March to help blunt the attack. The 5th Division took up a position around Corbie and in April the 15th Brigade took part in a counter-attack at Villers-Bretonneux on 25 April 1918, during which the 58th formed the brigade reserve. In early July, the battalion took part in an attack around Morlancourt on the Ancre as part of a feint during the Battle of Hamel. Later in the year, the Allies launched their own offensive, and the battalion next participated in the fighting at Amiens on 8 August. As the Allies gained momentum, this was followed by the Battle of Mont St Quentin and Péronne on 31 August and then finally, the Battle of St. Quentin Canal on 29 September. Placed into reserve again for rest and reinforcement, the war ended before the battalion saw further action, and it was disbanded on 24 March 1919.

During its wartime service, the unit lost 615 men killed and 1,550 men wounded. Members of the battalion received the following decorations: one Victoria Cross, eight Distinguished Service Orders with one Bar, one Officer of the Order of the British Empire, 20 Military Crosses with two Bars, 17 Distinguished Conduct Medals with one Bar, 71 Military Medals with six Bars, 30 Mentions in Despatches and eight Meritorious Service Medals. Rupert Moon was the battalion's only Victoria Cross recipient, receiving the award for his actions around Bullecourt in May 1917. The 58th was awarded a total of 16 battle honours for its involvement in the war in 1927.

=== Inter-war years ===
In 1921, it was decided that the Citizens Force would be re-organised along the lines of the AIF, adopting the numerical designations of AIF units and maintaining their battle honours in order to perpetuate these units. As a result of this, the battalion was raised again in May 1921, attached to the 15th Brigade, then part of the 3rd Division and based in Melbourne. Upon formation, the newly raised battalion drew personnel from the 2nd and 5th Battalions of the 58th Infantry Regiment, and parts of the 21st Infantry and 29th Light Horse Regiments. When territorial designations were introduced in 1927, the battalion adopted the title of the "Essendon Rifles"; at the same time its motto – Nulli Cedere – was approved.

Following the election of the Scullin Labor government, the compulsory training scheme was abolished in 1929 and in its place a new system was introduced whereby the Citizens Forces would be maintained on a part-time, voluntary basis only. It also adopted the title of the "Militia" at this time. The result of this change in recruitment policy was a significant drop in the size of the Army, falling by almost 20,000 men in one year as there was little prospect for training and as the financial difficulties of the Great Depression meant that few men were able to take time off from civilian employment for military service. Consequently, the decision was made to disband or amalgamate a number of units, with each brigade within the 3rd Division being reduced from four infantry battalions to three. The 58th Battalion was not one of those units chosen for amalgamation, although throughout the inter-war years its authorised strength was greatly reduced and poor attendance and limited training opportunities characterised the era.

In 1936, some efforts were made to reinvigorate the training program and individual units implemented recruiting campaigns. Two years later, as the political situation in Europe grew worse, the Army made a more concerted effort to improve the readiness of the Militia and throughout 1938 increased training opportunities were provided. At the annual camp held that year all units of the 15th Brigade were given negative feedback about their performance, however, the 58th was singled out as having performed particularly poorly. Throughout the inter-war years, the battalion went through a number of name changes: "58th Battalion (Essendon Rifles)", "58th Battalion (The Melbourne Rifles)", "58th Battalion (Essendon Coburg & Brunswick Rifles)" and "58th Battalion (Essendon, Coburg, Brunswick Regiment)", the last of which was adopted in 1939. From 1931, the battalion maintained an alliance with the Northamptonshire Regiment.

=== World War II ===
Following the outbreak of World War II, as a result of the provisions of the Defence Act (1903) which prohibited sending the Militia to fight outside of Australian territory, the decision was made to raise an all volunteer force, known as the Second Australian Imperial Force (2nd AIF), for service overseas. The result of this decision was that the Militia units that already existed lost some of their best personnel who were used to form a cadre of trained men upon which to raise the units of the 2nd AIF, while the units themselves were relegated to administering the training of conscripts that were called up following the reinstitution of the compulsory training scheme in January 1940.

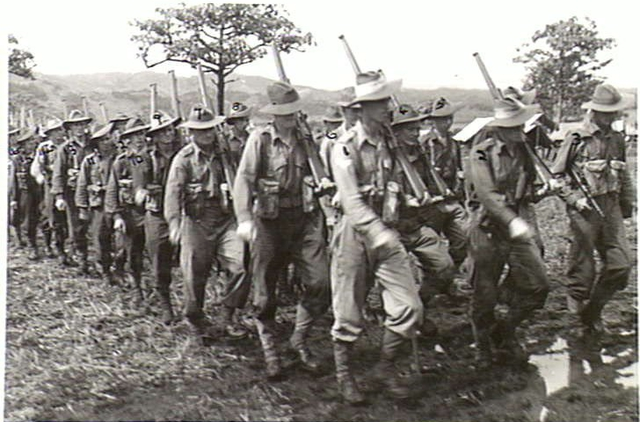
Men from the 58th/59th Battalion in the Ramu Valley, January 1944

At the same time, they were also progressively called upon to undertake brief periods of continuous training during 1940 and 1941 as part of an effort to improve the nation's level of military preparedness. Throughout 1941 the 58th Battalion was stationed around Seymour in Victoria before undertaking further training near Casino, New South Wales, in 1942. At this time, the 15th Brigade was briefly expanded with the arrival of the 24th Battalion from the 10th Brigade, which had been disbanded as part of a minor demobilisation of forces that was necessitated by a manpower shortage that had developed within the Australian economy. As a result of the addition of the 24th Battalion, the 58th and 59th Battalions were amalgamated to form the 58th/59th Battalion (Essendon, Coburg, Brunswick/ Hume Regiment), in order to maintain the triangular structure of the brigade. This came into effect on 27 August 1942. The 58th/59th Battalion would remain linked for the next four years, seeing action in the South-west Pacific in 1943–45. They were disbanded on 23 February 1946.

=== Legacy ===
In 1948, the Citizen Military Forces (CMF) was reformed and the battalion was raised again, albeit as an amalgamated unit with the 32nd Battalion as the 58th/32nd Battalion (Essendon Regiment), based in Essendon, Victoria. The 58th/32nd remained in existence until 1960 when, after the pentropic re-organisation of the Australian Army, the battalion was absorbed as part of the Royal Victoria Regiment. The battalion received 12 battle honours for World War II in 1961, which it bore for the 58th/59th Battalion. Its honours and traditions are now maintained by the 5th/6th Battalion, Royal Victoria Regiment (5/6 RVR). The battalion's colours were laid up on 10 May 1970 in the Essendon Town Hall.

== Battle honours ==
The 58th Battalion was awarded the following battle honours:

- World War I: Somme 1916–18, Bullecourt, Ypres 1917, Menin Road, Polygon Wood, Poelcappelle, Passchendaele, Ancre 1918, Villers-Bretonneux, Amiens, Albert 1918, Mont St Quentin, Hindenburg Line, St Quentin Canal, France and Flanders 1916–18, and Egypt 1916.
- World War II: South West Pacific 1943–45, Bobdubi II, Komiatum, Liberation of Australian New Guinea, Finisterres, Barum, Hongorai River, Egans Ridge–Hongorai Ford, Hari River, Mobai River, and Mivo River.

== Commanding officers ==
The 58th Battalion was commanded by the following officers:

World War I

- Lieutenant Colonel Charles Robert Davies;
- Lieutenant Colonel Alfred Jackson;
- Lieutenant Colonel Charles Aloysius Denehy;
- Lieutenant Colonel Charles Vincent Watson

Inter-war years

- Lieutenant Colonel Nelson Frederick Wellington.

World War II

- Lieutenant Colonel William Cannon;
- Lieutenant Colonel Frederick Hale.

== Notes ==
Footnotes

Citations
