= 57th/60th Battalion (Australia) =

Infantry battalion of the Australian Army

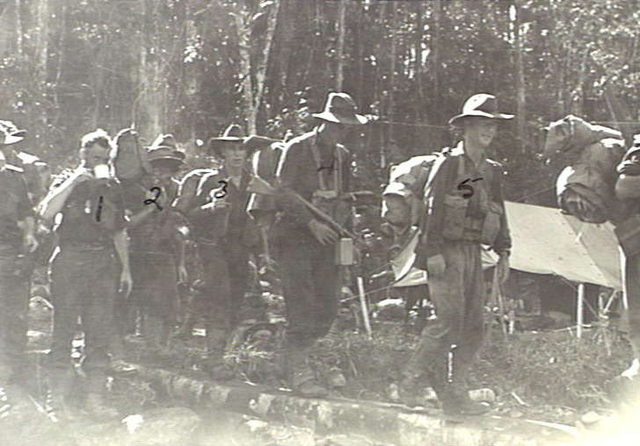
- Men from the 57th/60th Battalion advance up the Faria River in February 1944
- Active: 1930–46
- Country: Australia
- Branch: Australian Army
- Type: Infantry
- Size: ~800–900 men (Note: In their earlier battles of WW2, the normal size of an Australian infantry battalion was 910 men all ranks, based upon deployment to the relatively open or expansive terrain of North Africa and the Middle East (El Alamein in Egypt, Bardia and Tobruk in Libya, and Damascus and Beirut in Syria) . However, the 3rd Division was slated for battle in the South West Pacific theatre of World War II, and was therefore reorganised into the jungle establishment. The size of the 57th/60th Battalion and others was therefore reduced to 803 men all ranks.)
- Part of: 15th Brigade, 3rd Division (Note: However, during the significant operations in the Markham and Ramu Valleys and the Finisterre Range campaigns the 57th/60th Battalion along with the other units of the 15th Brigade were attached to the 7th Division.)
- Nickname: Merri/Heidelberg Regiment
- Motto: Hard'n'Bold (Note: The motto is a combination of the mottos of the 57th Battalion, 'Strike Hard', and the 60th Battalion, 'Swift and Bold'. In turn these mottos were adapted or adopted from the mottos of the 57th (West Middlesex) Regiment of Foot, 'The Die Hards', and the 60th Regiment of Foot, the King's Royal Rifle Corps, 'Swift and Bold'.)
- Colours: Black alongside red
- Engagements: Second World War: New Guinea campaign; Bougainville campaign

Insignia
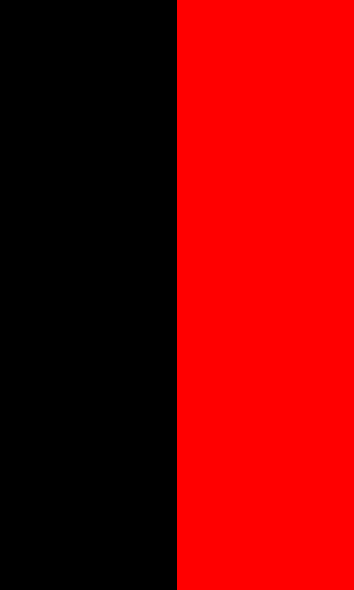
- Unit colour patch

The 57th/60th Battalion was an infantry battalion of the Australian Army which served during the Second World War. It was formed in 1930 as part of the Militia by the amalgamation of the 57th Battalion and the 60th Battalion.

It was assigned to the 15th Brigade, 3rd Division in Victoria. Following the outbreak of the war, the battalion was initially used in a garrison role in Australia before being deployed to New Guinea in March 1943. The 57th/60th performed garrison and engineering roles at Tsili Tsili Airfield in the Watut Valley, while the rest of 15th Brigade took part in the Salamaua–Lae campaign, following which the 15th Brigade including the 57th/60th was formed up for battle in its entirety. Command was transferred to the 7th Division and the 15th Brigade including the 57th/60th then fought in the Markham and Ramu Valley and the Finisterre Range campaigns.

The 57th/60th Battalion remained in New Guinea until July 1944 before being brought back to Australia for home leave, further training and reorganisation. Command of the battalion along with the rest of the 15th Brigade was transferred back to the 3rd Division, and the battalion embarked for Bougainville in January 1945 where Australian forces had replaced the Americans, taking part in the advance towards Buin through the southern sector of the island until early July 1945, at which time they were relieved by the 15th Battalion.

Following the end of hostilities the battalion was gradually demobilised and was finally disbanded in March 1946. The battalion colours (of the 57th Battalion and the 60th Battalion) are laid up in the crypt of the Shrine of Remembrance in Melbourne, Australia.

== History ==
The 57th/60th Battalion was formed in 1930 by the amalgamation of two previously existing units of the Militia, the 57th Battalion, "The Merri Regiment", and the 60th Battalion, "The Heidelberg Regiment". Both of these original battalions were from the northern suburbs of Melbourne and had fought during the First World War with the First Australian Imperial Force on the Western Front. At that time they were formed up as part of the 15th Brigade under Brigadier Harold Elliott.

The economic privations of the Great Depression and the end of the compulsory training scheme had resulted in a reduction in the size of Australia's military forces and as a result there was a need to rationalise the number of active units. Upon amalgamation the 57th/60th Battalion adopted the territorial title of the "Merri/Heidelberg Regiment" and they were once again assigned to the 15th Brigade, which was part of the 3rd Division of the Second Australian Imperial Force.

=== World War 2 ===
At the outset of the Second World War, initial operations were conceived to be likely in the Middle East, France and later possibly the United Kingdom. Due to the provisions of the Defence Act (1903) which prohibited sending the Militia to fight outside of Australian territory, (Note: This stipulation also applied to the 2,800-strong Permanent Military Force.) (Note: Of the 32 Militia battalions that saw active service during the war, all but three were given AIF status. Essentially this meant that as more than 65 per cent of their wartime establishment had volunteered for service overseas, the battalion could be sent anywhere, including outside of Australian territory. The 57th/60th Battalion was one of the 29 battalions to receive this status.) the decision was made to raise an all volunteer force to serve overseas while the Militia would be used to defend the Australian mainland and to improve Australia's overall level of readiness through the re-institution of compulsory military service and extended periods of continuous training.

The diplomatic entry of Japan into the war in 1940, however, having signed the Axis Tripartite Pact in September of that year, posed a heightened potential threat to the Australian mainland. As a result, the under-prepared Australian military began to mobilise for likely war in the South West Pacific. The Militia was called up for full-time service to undertake defensive duties on the Australian continental mainland and in the Australian territory of New Guinea. For its part, the 57th/60th Battalion conducted a number of training camps during 1940 and into 1941 at Mount Martha before moving camp northwards to Trawool and Seymour in central Victoria early in 1942.

Japan officially entered the war on 7 December 1941 with coordinated attacks upon Hong Kong, Guam, Pearl Harbor, Wake Island, the Philippines and other allied-occupied strategic targets in the Pacific. The Bombing of Darwin in February 1942 only served to heighten concerns that an invasion of the Australian mainland was possible, the event serving to focus the minds of the Australian military. A few months later, in March and April 1942, the 57th/60th Battalion along with the rest of the Australian 15th Brigade was relocated to New South Wales where they were given the task of defending the Tweed Valley in case of Japanese invasion. As a major fitness and training exercise the battalion was route marched from Seymour to Albury (217 km), whereupon they took a train to the town of Casino, New South Wales. The part played by the 57th/60th in the defence of the mainland was to conduct a lengthy bivouac in the area just north of Casino. Later in the year, in September 1942, the 15th Brigade was released from this defensive task and sent north to Caboolture and Cooroy, Queensland, where they began training for deployment to fight the Japanese in New Guinea.

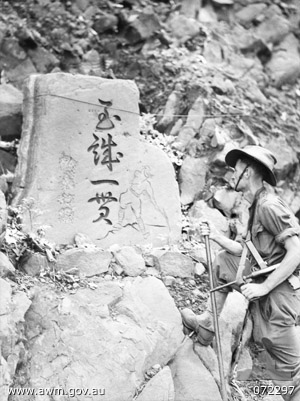
A soldier from the 57th/60th Battalion examines a Japanese obelisk in New Guinea, April 1944

==== New Guinea ====
The 57th/60th Battalion embarked for New Guinea in two contingents. One contingent entrained on 2 March travelling from Caboolture to Townsville to establish there a staging camp for themselves. This camp was subsequently used by many units deploying to the South West Pacific. This first contingent of the 57th/60th embarked from Townsville aboard the MV Duntroon on 8 March 1943, the troops disembarking on 10 March at Port Moresby, 590 nautical miles to the north (1,091 kilometres). The other contingent entrained from Caboolture for Brisbane on 9 March and embarked from Brisbane on 10 March 1943 aboard HMAS Katoomba, the troops disembarking on 16 March at Port Moresby, after a journey at sea of 1,127 nautical miles (2,087 kilometres).

At this time the battalion had an authorised strength of 803 personnel and was organised into one battalion headquarters and five companies. There was one headquarters company and there were four rifle companies, designated 'A' to 'D'. Headquarters company consisted of six platoons, numbered 1 to 6, fulfilling consecutively the combat functions of signals, medium machine-gun fire support, mortar fire support, anti-tank fire support, pioneers and transport. If under attack, the pioneer platoon formed the guard platoon for Battalion Headquarters. Each of the rifle companies consisted of three platoons, numbered consecutively throughout the battalion, from 7 Platoon (of A Company) to 18 Platoon (of D Company). Attached also were elements of the 15th Field Ambulance and the 15th Field Engineers.

The 15th Brigade, excluding the 57th/60th, moved north to take part in the battle around the Huon Peninsula and the Huon Gulf, specifically in the Salamaua–Lae campaign. While the rest of the 15th Brigade took part in this fighting, the 57th/60th Battalion began in early July 1943 to move to the Watut Valley to set up and conduct the defensive garrison for the Allied airbase being secretly constructed at Tsili Tsili by American airborne engineers. The base at Tsili Tsili was required to provide fighter support for bombers on long-range bombing missions. Allied bombers could reach Japanese airbases flying from Port Moresby, but their fighter escorts could not, so the fighters needed a base north of the Owen Stanley Ranges.

Due to the difficult terrain and demands upon aircraft availability, there were significant troop movement and engineering delays for both the 57th/60th and for the American engineers involved in occupying and commissioning the base, including the US 871st Airborne Engineer Battalion with whom the 57th/60th worked closely to establish a functioning and well-defended airbase. For example, it took seven weeks to transport the entire 57th/60th north by plane into Nadzab and Tsili Tsili. Meanwhile, movement of engineering equipment such as bulldozers and graders was also difficult. It took several Douglas C-47 Skytrain transport planes for the 871st Airborne to transport just one of their heavy engineering machines into the battlefields to the north. These machines had to be first dismantled in Port Moresby and then flown in pieces over the Owen Stanley Range using five or six transport planes. Initially, they were landed at the airfield at Nadzab. They were then reassembled and used to build roads into the Tsili Tsili area so that more troops, supplies and machinery could be transported overland for the construction and commissioning of the Tsili Tsili airbase itself. Both the Australians of the 57th/60th and the Americans of the 871st Airborne worked to build the roads into the Tsili Tsili fighter aerodrome from Nadzab over 60 kilometres (37.5 miles) away while also constructing the Tsili Tsili landing strip. In time the base at Tsili Tsili was also upgraded to enable it to land the larger transport planes. The Commanding Officer of the 57th/60th in New Guinea, Lieutenant Colonel Robert R. Marston, and others in the battalion, noted that the Americans were co-operative, generous and "always overstocked".

As on the Kokoda Track, at Buna and Gona, and every battleground in New Guinea, there were difficulties with air transport, engineering, supply, communications, tactics and strategic planning caused by the wet climate, jungle illnesses, the topography and the density of the jungle vegetation. Sometimes the soldiers were expected to remain at peak health, fitness and performance to fight in places where, for health reasons, the local Papuans very wisely would not live.

The Japanese command at Wewak eventually discovered the secret Tsili-Tsili airfield and launched preemptive attacks on 15 and 16 August 1943. The bombing raids, including a kamikaze act on a church parade, inflicted many Australian and American casualties, but the raids overall did little damage to the airfield. Therefore, between 17 and 21 August 1943, Allied forces were able to launch a series of large air attacks that first bombed and then strafed all four Japanese airfields around Wewak (at Wewak and satellite airfields at Boram, Dagua and But), heavily damaging many aircraft and facilities. Fighter escorts for the bombers came from Tsili Tsili. The 57th/60th Battalion remained on guard and construction duty at Tsili Tsili while these Allied air attacks were being launched.

As a result of these coordinated bombing raids, Japan lost air superiority over New Guinea for the remainder of the war.

Meanwhile, the airfield at Tsili Tsili continued to function as both an offensive base and a supply base. It was capable not only of launching USAAF Fifth Air Force and Royal Australian Air Force fighter squadrons into the air, but also of landing dozens of the Douglas C-47 Skytrain supply planes (known colloquially at the time as the "bully beefs") every day.

Following the successful completion of the Salamaua–Lae campaign and the establishment of the Tsili Tsili airbase, both contingents of the 15th Brigade moved back to Port Moresby in September 1943. The 57th/60th remained in Port Moresby until early in 1944 when the 15th Brigade was detached from the 3rd Division and placed under the command of the 7th Division to participate in the Finisterre Range campaign, specifically in the Markham and Ramu valleys. (The bulk of the 7th Division had been brought back to Australia by John Curtin following their successful campaign against the Vichy French in the Syria–Lebanon campaign, and had further distinguished themselves along the Kokoda Track.) The 57th/60th and their equipment arrived by plane at Dumpu in the Ramu Valley, on 7 January 1944. This was the first time that all three battalions, the 24th, the 57th/60th and the 58th/59th Australian Infantry Battalions, had been brought together to form up for battle in New Guinea as the 15th Brigade in its entirety under Brigadier Heathcote Hammer, despite all having been attached to the 15th Brigade since their departure from Australia.

In February 1944 the 15th Brigade moved up the Faria Valley to take over from the 18th Brigade which had been fighting around the Kankiryo Saddle. The 57th/60th Battalion relieved the 2/9th Battalion on the western side of the saddle. The brigade then advanced towards Madang. Moving along the Bogadjim road, the 57th/60th Battalion mounted a company attack on a Japanese position on the high ground overlooking Bogadjim near Bau-ak on 10 April. Three days later they occupied the village of Bogadjim. The 57th/60th continued the advance towards the coast and on 24 April 1944, a patrol from the battalion was the first Allied unit to reach Madang, which had been abandoned by the rapidly retreating Japanese.

Following its occupation of Madang, and after almost 18 months in New Guinea, the 57th/60th Battalion was withdrawn back to Australia for rest and home leave. The official war historian, Gavin Long, considered that with its extensive service the 15th Brigade had marched over more of New Guinea than any other Allied formation. Long also recognised the fundamental importance of what he called "Tili Tsili Force", largely the 57th/60th Battalion, in the overall prosecution by the Allies of the war in New Guinea.

The corvette HMAS Katoomba departed Madang on 26 July 1944, carrying the 57th/60th back to Townsville, where landfall was made on 30 July 1944.

==== Bougainville Island ====
The battalion was called together again to the Atherton Tablelands in Queensland. After a foreshortened training period, the 57th/60th received orders to rejoin the 3rd Division which was at the time on Bougainville as part of the Australian II Corps, Australian forces having taken over responsibility for the island from the Americans in November 1944. The battalion embarked from Townsville on 1 January 1945 aboard the Fairisle, disembarking at Torokina, Bougainville, on 5 January.

Following fighting around Slater's Knoll the 15th Brigade moved forward and relieved the 7th Brigade in the southern sector of the island and shortly afterwards resumed the advance along the axis of the Buin Road, crossing the Hongorai River, and then the Hari and Mobiai Rivers before being relieved on 1 July by the 29th Brigade. During this time the 57th/60th took part in the Battle of the Hongorai River, as well as the advance to the Mivo River, undertaking a diversionary drive along the Commando Road on the left flank of the brigade's main effort. The Commando Road battle honour is unique to the 57th/60th Battalion.

=== War's end and disbandment ===
The 15th Battalion relieved the 57th/60th on 2 July 1945. The 57th/60th did not see combat again before the war came to an end, with the news coming the following month that the Japanese had surrendered as a result of the atomic bombings of Hiroshima and Nagasaki.

After the conclusion of hostilities, the 57th/60th Battalion carried out various garrison duties such as guarding some of the estimated 21,000 Japanese prisoners of war on Bougainville, and maintaining internal security and infrastructure while the demobilisation process took place. Personnel were gradually repatriated back to Australia or transferred to other units for further service. The battalion's numbers slowly decreased until in December 1945 the main body of the battalion returned to Australia aboard the passenger ship SS Ormiston (which had been torpedoed and repaired in 1943), departing Torokina on 29 November 1945 and arriving in Brisbane on 7 December. The battalion moved to Chermside, Queensland where demobilisation hastened. On 30 March 1946, the battalion was officially disbanded. Those who remained in the army, on Bougainville Island, Fauro Island and other places in the former theatre of war, were transferred to other army units (such as the 7th Battalion).

=== Personnel, memorials and commemoration ===
The battalion was formed in Melbourne and therefore counted among its ranks a majority of officers and soldiers from Victoria, particularly from their home ground around the northern suburbs of Melbourne (the "Merri/Heidelberg" recruitment zone), central Victoria and central northern Victoria. By the time of embarkation to New Guinea in 1943, however, the battalion strength also included a number of personnel who had enlisted in New South Wales (particularly from the Finley and Albury region of the Riverina), and Queensland, with a small few from Tasmania, South Australia and Western Australia. Two men came from the Australian Capital Territory and one from Papua New Guinea joined the battalion upon its arrival at Port Moresby.

For a time while the battalion was in New Guinea there were liaison officers from the Canadian Army attached to various Australian units. With the 57th/60th was one such Canadian attachment for the purposes of training, liaison between the allies, observation of Australian offensive manoeuvres and observation of Japanese defensive systems.

During the battalion's active service in training, in New Guinea and on Bougainville it lost 58 men killed in action or died of other causes, and 134 men wounded. Members of the battalion received the following decorations: one DSO, eight MCs, one DCM, 14 MMs, 24 MIDs and two EDs.

The battalion colours are laid up for safe keeping, officially in the custody of the Lord Mayor of Melbourne, at the crypt of the Shrine of Remembrance in Melbourne. The 57th/60th Battalion had no King's Colours or Regimental Colours of its own. Rather, by virtue of its battalion numbers and its history of formation (by amalgamation of the 57th and the 60th) it inherited the colours of both the 57th Battalion and the 60th Battalion. The Regimental Colours of the 57th and the 60th Battalions each already displayed the ten battle honours from World War 1. On 30 November 1960, the Queen gave permission for the battle honours from World War 2 to be emblazoned on (what were by then) the Queen's Colours rather than the Regimental Colours as would normally have been the practice.

The battalion Roll of Honour listing those who died in the service of the 57th/60th is located at panel 70 in the Commemorative Area at the Australian War Memorial.

The 57/60th Battalion Association commissioned a commemorative plaque as part of the Australian War Memorial's Plaque Dedication Program. The plaque is installed in the Outdoor Exhibition Area in the Eastern Precinct of the Main Building. A similar plaque was installed by the Association at the Memorial Garden of the Heidelberg Repatriation Hospital, Victoria. By virtue of its battalion numbers and its history the plaques display the colours of both the 57th Battalion, black alongside red, and the 60th Battalion, white alongside red. (Note: During World War 2 either shoulder patch was worn on the uniforms of members of the 57th/60th Battalion until late 1942, after which only the black alongside red shoulder patch was worn.)

== Commanding officers ==
The following officers served as commanding officer of the 57th/60th:

Inter-war years

- Lieutenant Colonel H.W.S. Jackson (1930–1935);
- Lieutenant Colonel J.E.S. Stevens (July 1935 – October 1939);

World War 2

- Lieutenant Colonel B. Evans (in Australia, December 1939 – July 1940);
- Lieutenant Colonel R.G. Moss (in Australia, August 1940 – May 1942);
- Lieutenant Colonel F.W.H. Hale (in Australia, August – September 1942)
- Lieutenant Colonel S.S. Creed (in Australia, September 1942 – February 1943);
- Lieutenant Colonel R.R. Marston (in Australia and New Guinea, February 1943 – January 1945);
- Lieutenant Colonel P.G.C. Webster (on Bougainville Island, January 1945 – October 1945);
- Lieutenant Colonel D.L.B. Goslett (on Bougainville Island, October 1945 – March 1946).

For the whole of World War 2 the 57th/60th Battalion formed part of the 15th Australian Infantry Brigade. The brigade was commanded by Brigadier Heathcote Hammer from June 1943 until the end of the war, including most of the 57th/60th's active service in New Guinea and all of it on Bougainville.

== Battle honours ==
For their service during the Second World War, the 57th/60th Battalion received the following battle honours:

- South-West Pacific 1943–45, Liberation of Australian New Guinea, Bogadjim, Mobiai River, Commando Road, Finisterres, Hongorai River, Hari River, Ogorata River, Mivo Ford.

== Notes ==
Footnotes

Citations
