= 57th Battalion (Australia) =

Australian 57th Battalion
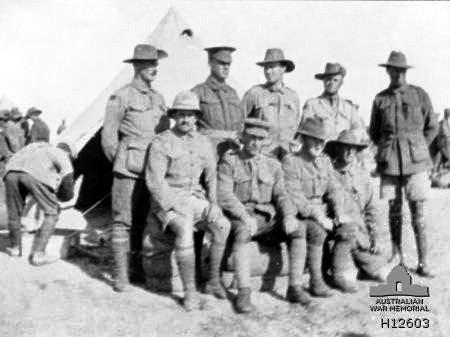
- Officers from the 57th Battalion in Egypt, February 1916
- Active: 1916–1919; 1921–1930
- Country: Australia
- Branch: Army
- Type: Infantry
- Size: ~900–1,000 men (Note: During World War I, the authorised strength of an Australian infantry battalion was 1,023 men. By the start of World War II, the authorised strength of an Australian infantry battalion was 910 men all ranks, however, later in the war it fell to 803.)
- Part of: 15th Brigade
- Nickname(s): The Merri Regiment
- Motto(s): Strike Hard
- Colours: Black beside red
- Engagements: World War I: Western Front

Insignia
- Unit colour patch

The 57th Battalion was an infantry battalion of the Australian Army. Formed in early 1916 for service during World War I, the battalion served on the Western Front until the end of the war, when it was disbanded. In 1921, it was re-raised as a part-time unit in Victoria, known as "The Merri Regiment". In 1930, the battalion was amalgamated with the 60th Battalion, to form the 57th/60th Battalion, which remained linked until it was disbanded in 1946, after having fought against the Japanese in New Guinea and Bougainville during World War II.

== History ==
=== World War I ===
The 57th Battalion was originally raised as a unit of the First Australian Imperial Force (AIF) in Egypt on 18 February 1916, as part of an expansion of the AIF that took place after the conclusion of the Gallipoli Campaign. This was achieved by joining half of the members of the veteran 5th Battalion with fresh recruits raised in Australia from north-east Victoria. With an authorised strength of 1,023 men, and under the command of Lieutenant Colonel James Stewart, together with the 58th, 59th and 60th Battalions, the 57th formed part of the 15th Brigade, which was assigned to the 5th Australian Division.

After formation, the battalion undertook a period of intense training in Egypt. In mid-1916, the AIF's infantry divisions were sent to the Western Front, and the battalion arrived in France, landing in Marseilles, in June 1916. Initially, it was sent to a "nursery sector" in northern France to gain experience, but in July the 57th experienced its taste of the fighting when the 5th Division was committed to the Battle of Fromelles, which was the AIF's debut on the Western Front. The attack at Fromelles proved to be disastrous for the Australians who suffered over 5,000 casualties, and it was later described as "the worst 24 hours in Australia's entire history". The 57th, having been held back in reserve, suffered less than the rest of the 15th Brigade and, as a result, remained in the line for several days after the battle after the other units had been withdrawn.

After Fromelles, the 57th spent the next two-and-a-half years in the trenches in France and Belgium, seeing action in many of the major battles fought by the Australians during this time. In 1917, the battalion joined the brief advance that the Allies undertook when the Germans withdrew to the Hindenburg Line. It then undertook a defensive role during the Second Battle of Bullecourt, before mounting a major attack at Polygon Wood in September after the 5th Division was transferred to the Ypres sector in Belgium. The following year, the Germans launched a major offensive on the Western Front after the collapse of Tsarist Russia. The 57th Battalion undertook a defensive role around Corbie, before participating in a counter-attack on the morning of 25 April 1918—Anzac Day—at Villers-Bretonneux. In July, the 60th took part in a diversionary attack around the Ancre River, during the Battle of Hamel. In August, the 57th joined the Allied offensive that ultimately ended the war. It fought its final action around the St Quentin Canal in September, before being withdrawn from the line the following month. After the war the battalion was disbanded in March 1919. During the war, the battalion suffered 505 killed and 1,253 wounded. For its involvement in the war, the 57th Battalion was awarded a total of 16 battle honours in 1927.

=== Inter-war years and World War II ===
In 1921, Australia's part-time military force, the Citizen Forces, was reorganised to perpetuate the numerical designations of the AIF, and the 57th Battalion was raised again. Assigned to the 15th Brigade, within the 3rd Military District. the battalion was headquartered at Preston, Victoria, and drew its personnel from the 2nd Battalion, 57th Infantry Regiment, and conducted weekly parades, weekend training and annual camps. In 1927, territorial designations were introduced and the 57th Battalion adopted the title of "The Merri Regiment". At this time it also adopted the motto of "Strike Hard". Initially, the battalion's strength was maintained through a mixture of voluntary and compulsory service; however, in 1930, the Universal Training Scheme was abolished by the Scullin Labor government. As a result of this, coupled with the hardships of the Great Depression, the battalion's strength dropped and as training opportunities became more scarce it was amalgamated with the 60th Battalion, to become the 57th/60th Battalion (Merri/Heidelberg Regiment). The amalgamated battalion remained linked for the next sixteen years, undertaking weekly parades, training weekends and annual camps when funding allowed. Throughout the inter-war years, an alliance was maintained with the Middlesex Regiment.

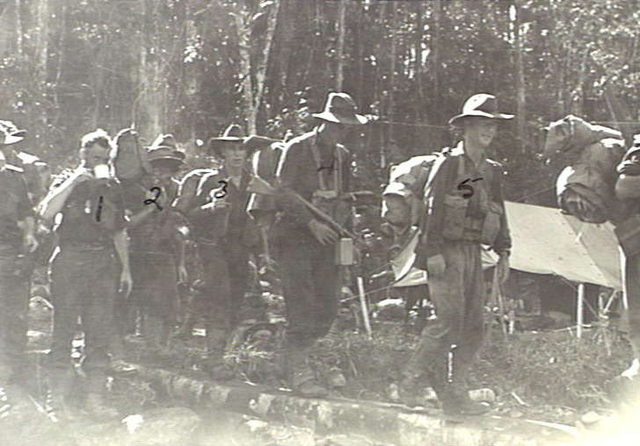
Men from the 57th/60th Battalion advance up the Faria River in February 1944

In the early years of World War II, the 57th/60th undertook training camps in Seymour, Victoria, as part of the 15th Brigade, assigned to the 3rd Division. It also undertook short periods of continuous service to provide training to conscripts called up under the Universal Training Scheme. Nevertheless, due to the provisions of the Defence Act, it was precluded from being sent overseas to fight and remained in Australia. Following Japan's entry into the war, the battalion was mobilised and undertook defensive duties in New South Wales and Queensland during 1942 and early 1943. In March 1943, the 57th/60th Battalion was sent to New Guinea along with the rest of the 15th Brigade. After arriving at Port Moresby, the battalion initially served as garrison troops around Tsilli Tsilli, before it was detached to the 7th Division during the Finisterre Range campaign in early 1944. Joining the fighting after the capture of the Kankiryo Saddle in January, the 57th/60th led the advance to Madang, reaching it in April 1944. In August, the 57th/60th returned to Australia for a brief period of rest on the Atherton Tablelands before the 15th Brigade was returned to the 3rd Division, and in November 1944 it was dispatched to Bougainville, where it took part in the southern advance towards Buin, including the Battle of the Hongorai River. After the war, the 57th/60th Battalion was disbanded on 30 March 1946.

== Alliances ==
The 57th Battalion held the following alliances:

- United Kingdom – The Middlesex Regiment: 1930–51.

== Battle honours ==
The 57th was awarded the following battle honours:

- World War I: Somme 1916–18, Bullecourt, Ypres 1917, Menin Road, Polygon Wood, Poelcappelle, Passchendaele, Ancre 1918, Villers-Bretonneux, Amiens, Albert 1918, Mont St Quentin, Hindenburg Line, St Quentin Canal, France and Flanders 1916–18, and Egypt 1916.

== Notes ==
Footnotes

Citations
