= 59th Battalion (Australia) =

Australian Army infantry battalion

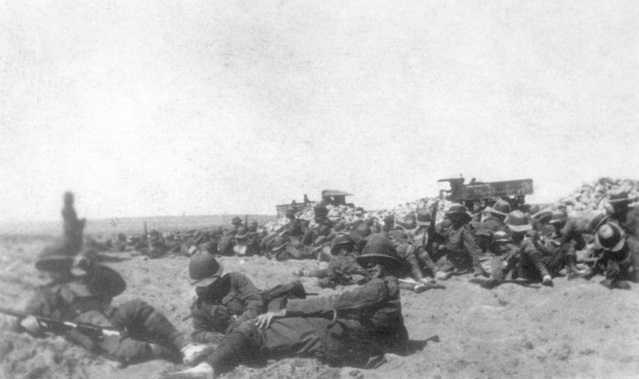
- 59th Battalion soldiers in Egypt, April 1916
- Active: 1916–1919; 1921–1942; 1952–1960
- Country: Australia
- Branch: Australian Army
- Type: Infantry
- Role: Line infantry
- Size: ~800–1,000 men (Note: During World War I, the approved establishment of an Australian infantry battalion was 1,023 men. By the beginning of World War II, after the 59th Battalion had been amalgamated, the normal size of an Australian infantry battalion had fallen to 910 men all ranks. Later still, following the reorganisation of the 3rd Division along the jungle establishment, the size dropped to 803 men all ranks.)
- Part of: 15th Brigade (in both WWI and WWII)
- Colours: Brown alongside red
- Engagements: World War I: Western Front; World War II: New Guinea campaign; Bougainville campaign

Insignia
- Unit colour patch

The 59th Battalion was an infantry battalion of the Australian Army. Initially raised for service during World War I, the battalion fought on the Western Front in France and Belgium between 1916 and 1918, before being disbanded in 1919. In 1921, it was re-raised as a part-time unit of the Militia in Victoria. They remained in existence until 1942 when, due to a manpower shortage in the Australian economy, the decision was made to amalgamate the battalion with the 58th Battalion to form the 58th/59th Battalion. Together they remained linked throughout World War II, serving in New Guinea and Bougainville in 1943–1945. In 1952, the 59th Battalion was re-raised and subsequently was absorbed into the Royal Victoria Regiment in 1960.

== History ==
=== World War I ===
The 59th Battalion was originally raised as a unit of the First Australian Imperial Force (AIF) in Egypt on 21 February 1916 for service in World War I as part of an expansion of the AIF that took place following the end of the Gallipoli campaign. The battalion was formed through the joining of half of the members of the 7th Battalion with fresh recruits raised in Australia from rural Victoria. Together with the 57th, 58th and 60th Battalions, the 59th formed part of the 15th Brigade, attached to the 5th Australian Division.

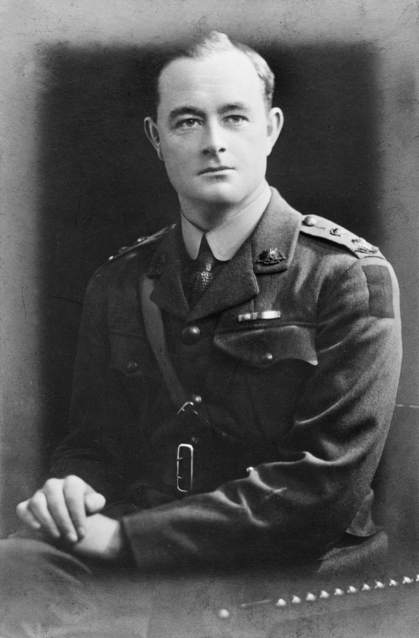
Lieutenant Colonel John Scanlan, who commanded the 59th Battalion during World War I

After completing its formation, the 5th Division was transferred to the Western Front. Arriving in France on 23 June, the battalion experienced its first taste of fighting on the Western Front in July when it was involved in the Battle of Fromelles, suffering heavy casualties to machine gun fire when it attacked in the first wave. During early 1917, in an effort to shorten their lines of communication, the Germans withdrew to prepared positions of the Hindenburg Line; a brief advance followed as the Allies followed them up. During this phase of the war the 59th Battalion was not committed to any major attacks, but it did play a defensive role at the end of the Second Battle of Bullecourt in May, holding the ground that the Australians had gained earlier in the fighting. Later in the year, the Australians were transferred to Belgium where, in late September, the 59th took part in the Battle of Polygon Wood.

The following year, the collapse of Tsarist Russia allowed the Germans to launch a large-scale offensive on the Western Front known as the Spring Offensive, which initially forced the Allies back towards Paris. In late March, the Australian divisions were moved south to help shore up the line, and the 5th Division took up a position around Corbie. In the fighting that followed, the 59th Battalion took part in a counter-attack at Villers-Bretonneux on 25 April 1918. After the German offensive was halted, a brief period of lull followed during which the Allies sought to regain the initiative, and in early July, the 59th took part in a diversionary attack on the Ancre River during the Battle of Hamel. Later in the year, the Allies launched their own offensive, the Hundred Days Offensive, and the battalion took part in the fighting at Amiens on 8 August. A series of advances followed, resulting in further battles: the Battle of Mont St Quentin and Péronne on 31 August and lastly the Battle of St. Quentin Canal on 29 September. In early October, the battalion was withdrawn from the line for rest and reorganisation, having suffered heavily during the earlier fighting. They remained out of the line until the war ended and subsequently the battalion saw no further action, and it was disbanded on 24 March 1919.

During its war service, the 59th lost 795 men killed and 1,619 wounded. Members of the battalion received the following decorations: two Distinguished Service Orders with one Bar, 17 Military Crosses, 14 Distinguished Conduct Medals with one Bar, 51 Military Medals with four Bars, eight Meritorious Service Medals, 24 Mentions in Despatches, and eight foreign awards. A total of 16 battle honours were awarded to the 59th Battalion in 1927.

=== Inter-war years and later ===
After the AIF was demobilised in 1921, Australia's part-time military force, the Citizen Force, was reorganised to replicate the formations of the AIF. As a result, the previously existing Citizen Force infantry regiments were redesignated to perpetuate the numbers of the AIF battalions. As a result, the 59th Battalion was raised again, drawing personnel mainly from the 2nd and 5th Battalions of the 59th Infantry Regiment, as well as part of the 60th Infantry and 29th Light Horse. When territorial designations were adopted in 1927, the battalion became known as the "59th Battalion (The Coburg-Brunswick Regiment)"; its motto – Fidelis Et Audax – was also approved at this time. Upon re-formation, the 59th was once again assigned to the 15th Brigade, which was then under the command of the 3rd Division. Due to the lack of numbers and funding following the Great Depression and the suspension of the compulsory training scheme, the battalion's authorised strength was greatly reduced during the inter-war years and it suffered from a lack of recruits and training opportunities during this time. An alliance with the East Lancashire Regiment began in 1926.

In 1939, the battalion underwent a name change, adopting the territorial title of the "Hume Regiment", when its recruitment territory was re-adjusted with the 59th Battalion. From 1938 to 1940, the 59th was commanded by Lieutenant Colonel Ernest Purnell Hill. In 1940, Lieutenant Colonel Rupert Whalley took over the role of commander, filling the post until 1942. On 27 August 1942, as a result of a governmental decision to reduce the size of the Militia and return some of its personnel to civilian industry, the 59th Battalion amalgamated with the 58th Battalion becoming the 58th/59th Battalion. The 58/59th Battalion would go on to see action in World War II in the South-West Pacific during the New Guinea and Bougainville campaigns in 1943–1945. It was disbanded on 23 February 1946.

Following the end of the war, Australia's part-time military force was re-raised in 1948 under the guise of the Citizens Military Force. The 59th Battalion was not re-formed at this time, however. In 1952, the battalion was raised again as the "59th Battalion (Hume Regiment)" and assigned to the 6th Brigade. Marine Artillery was approved as the regimental march in 1953. On 23 March 1958, the battalion became the first infantry battalion in Australia to be granted the Freedom of Entry to a city when it was afforded the honour by the city of Shepparton, Victoria. After the Pentropic re-organisation of the Australian Army in 1960, the battalion was absorbed into the 2nd Battalion, Royal Victoria Regiment, forming a company-sized element of that unit. The following year, even though it was no longer on the Army's order of battle, the 59th was awarded 12 battle honours, which it bore for the 58th/59th Battalion. Later, 2 RVR was redesignated as the 8th/7th Battalion, Royal Victoria Regiment, and this unit now maintains the honours and traditions of the 59th Battalion.

Australian novelist David Denholm, who wrote about World War II, served with the 58th/59th Battalion in New Guinea and on Bougainville.

== Battle honours ==
The 59th Battalion was awarded the following battle honours:

- World War I: Somme 1916–18, Bullecourt, Ypres 1917, Menin Road, Polygon Wood, Poelcappelle, Passchendaele, Ancre 1918, Villers-Bretonneux, Amiens, Albert 1918, Mont St Quentin, Hindenburg Line, St Quentin Canal, France and Flanders 1916–18, and Egypt 1916.
- World War II: South-West Pacific 1943–45, Bobdubi II, Komiatum, Liberation of Australian New Guinea, Finisterres, Barum, Hongorai River, Egans Ridge–Hongorai Ford, Hari River, Ogorata River, Mobiai River and Mivo River.

== Commanders ==
The following officers commanded the 59th Battalion:

World War I

- Ernest Albert Harris;
- Herbert Thomas Christoph Layh;
- Charles Conway Mason;
- John Joseph Scanlan

World War II

- Ernest Purnell Hill;
- Rupert Whalley.

The following officers commanded the 58th/59th Battalion:

- Rupert Whalley;
- Arthur Palmer;
- Patrick Starr;
- George Warfe;
- Hyde Sweet;
- William Mayberry.

== Notes ==
Footnotes

Citations
