= 60th Battalion (Australia) =

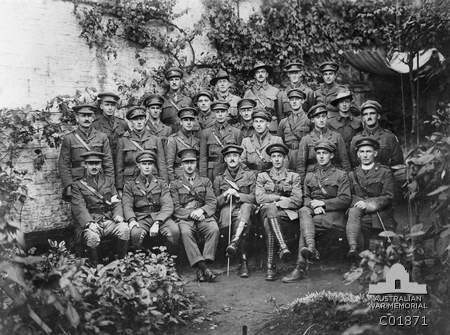
- Portrait of 60th Battalion officers, c. 1917
- Active: 1916–1918; 1921–1930
- Country: Australia
- Branch: Army
- Type: Infantry
- Size: ~900 – 1,000 men (Note: During World War I, the authorised strength of an Australian infantry battalion was 1,023 men. By the start of World War II, the authorised strength of an Australian infantry battalion was 910 men all ranks, however, later in the war it fell to 803.)
- Part of: 15th Brigade
- Nickname(s): The Heidelberg Regiment
- Motto(s): Celer Et Audax (Swift and Bold)
- Colours: White alongside red
- Engagements: World War I: Western Front

Insignia
- Unit colour patch

The 60th Battalion was an infantry battalion of the Australian Army. It was raised for service during World War I in 1916 and took part in the fighting on the Western Front for two-and-a-half years. Following the end of the war it was disbanded before being re-raised in 1921 as a part-time unit of the Citizen Force. In 1930, as a result of manpower shortages, the 60th was amalgamated with the 57th Battalion to form the 57th/60th Battalion and this unit subsequently saw service in the South West Pacific during World War II fighting against the Japanese, before being disbanded in 1946.

== History ==
=== World War I ===
The 60th Battalion was originally raised as a unit of the First Australian Imperial Force (1st AIF) in Egypt on 24 February 1916 for service in World War I as part of an expansion of the Australian forces that took place following the Gallipoli campaign. This expansion saw experienced personnel being drawn from 1st Division units, and joining with fresh recruits from Australia to form new battalions. In the case of the 60th, its cadre came from the 8th Battalion, a predominately Victorian unit, while its new recruits were also drawn from that state. Together with the 57th, 58th and 59th Battalions, the 60th formed part of the 15th Brigade, attached to the 5th Australian Division.

Shortly after being raised, the battalion was sent to France, arriving there on 28 June, and experienced its first taste of fighting against the Germans on the Western Front in July when it was involved in the Battle of Fromelles. During the course of the battle, the battalion suffered 757 casualties and was almost destroyed. After that, the 60th Battalion spent the next two and a half years in the trenches in France and Belgium, where it took part in a number of significant actions. Throughout 1917, as the Germans began to withdraw towards the Hindenburg Line, the battalion took part in the Allied advance. Later, at Bullecourt in May, the 60th were engaged in a defensive capacity. Following this, the AIF was moved to the Ypres sector where, on 26 September 1917, the 60th Battalion were committed to the fighting around Polygon Wood.

In early 1918, following the collapse of the Russian resistance on the Eastern Front in the wake of the October Revolution, the Germans had been able to transfer a large number of troops to the Western Front. (Note: At 30 November 1917, there were 160 German divisions on the Western Front. Following the Treaty of Brest-Litovsk, this rose to 208.) As a result, in March, they launched their German spring offensive. With the Germans making rapid gains, the Australian units were thrown into the line to blunt the attack. The 60th Battalion, along with the rest of the 5th Division, were allocated to the Corbie sector. On 25 April 1918, Anzac Day, the battalion took part in a counterattack at Villers-Bretonneux. In July, the 60th took part in a diversionary attack around the Ancre River, during the Battle of Hamel. Later, on 8 August 1918, they went into battle at Amiens, at the start of Allied Hundred Days Offensive, which ultimately resulted in the end of the war. In September 1918, with the 1st AIF suffering considerable manpower shortages due to heavy losses and insufficient replacements, one battalion in each brigade was ordered to disband in order to provide reinforcements to the other battalions within the brigades. Within the 15th Brigade, the 60th Battalion was the unit which was ordered to disband. The men, however, did not wish to be sent to other units and refused to obey the order to disband. Nevertheless, after being spoken to by the highly regarded Brigadier General Harold Elliott, the men agreed to follow the order and the battalion was subsequently disbanded on 27 September 1918.

During the course of the war, the 60th Battalion lost 701 men killed in action and 1,340 wounded. Members of the battalion received the following decorations: one Companion of the Order of St Michael and St George, one Distinguished Service Order, 10 Military Crosses and one Bar, 10 Distinguished Conduct Medals, 47 Military Medals and two Bars, 20 Mentions in Despatches, three Meritorious Service Medals and four foreign awards. A total of 15 battle honours were awarded to the 60th Battalion in 1927.

=== Inter-war years ===
Following the war, Australia's part-time military force was re-organised in 1921 after the demobilisation of the AIF was completed. Through a process of redesignating the previously existing infantry regiments of the Citizen Force, the battalion was raised again in the state of Victoria. With its headquarters at Westgarth, it was once again assigned to the 15th Brigade, although at divisional level they were placed under the 3rd Division, and the battalion drew its personnel from a number of previously existing part-time units such as the 2/60th Infantry, 2/29th Infantry, 5/29th Infantry and 29th Light Horse Regiments, which had been established in 1918 in the regimental areas from where the 60th Battalion had drawn its recruits when it was formed in 1916.

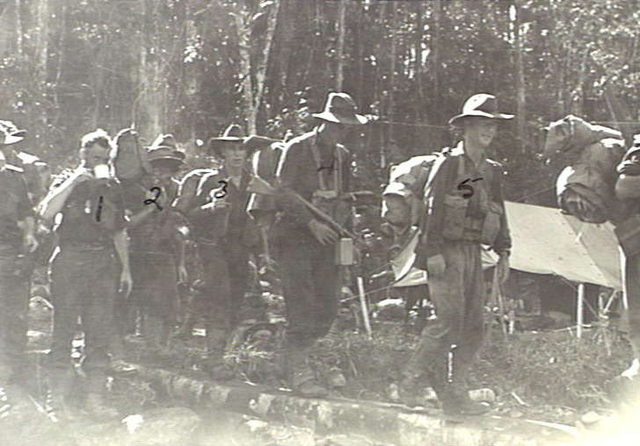
Men from the 57th/60th Battalion advance up the Faria River in February 1944

In 1927, territorial titles were introduced and the 60th Battalion went through a number of name changes: firstly the "Brunswick Carlton Infantry Regiment", the "Jika Jika Regiment" and finally "The Heidelberg Regiment". At this time it adopted the motto "Celer Et Audax", meaning "Swift and Bold". In 1930, following the suspension of the compulsory training scheme by the newly elected Scullin Labor government and the establishment of the all-volunteer Militia scheme, a combination of a lack of volunteers and economic austerity measures following the Great Depression resulted in the battalion being amalgamated with the 57th Battalion, to become the 57th/60th Battalion (Merri/Heidelberg Regiment). They would remain linked for the next 16 years, seeing action in World War II in the South West Pacific in the New Guinea and Bougainville campaigns during 1943–45, before finally being disbanded on 30 March 1946. After the war, the 60th Battalion was not re-raised, although in 1961, it was awarded 10 battle honours for World War II, which it bore for the 57th/60th Battalion.

== Battle honours ==
The 60th Battalion received the following battle honours:

- World War I: Somme 1916–18, Bullecourt, Ypres 1917, Menin Road, Polygon Wood, Poelcappelle, Passchendaele, Ancre 1918, Villers-Bretonneux, Amiens, Albert 1918, Mont St Quentin, Hindenburg Line, France and Flanders 1916–18, and Egypt 1916.
- World War II: South-West Pacific 1943–45, Liberation of Australian New Guinea, Bogadjim, Mobiai River, Commando Road, Finisterres, Hongorai River, Hari River, Ogorata River, and Mivo Ford.

== Commanding officers ==
During World War I, the following officers served as commanding officer of the 60th Battalion:

- Lieutenant Colonel John Woodhouse Barnett Field;
- Lieutenant Colonel Alfred Jackson;
- Lieutenant Colonel Harry Mcleod Duigan;
- Lieutenant Colonel Charles Stewart Davies;
- Lieutenant Colonel Norman Marshall; and
- Lieutenant Colonel Herbert Thomas Christoph Layh.

== Notes ==
Footnotes

Citations
