= 15th Brigade (Australia) =

1916-1945 Australian Army infantry brigade

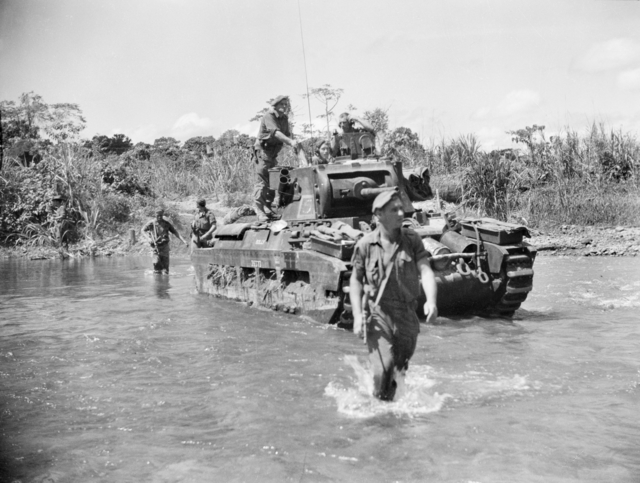
- Troops and Matilda tanks from the 15th Brigade cross the Hongorai River in May 1945
- Active: 1912–1919; 1921–1945
- Country: Australia
- Branch: Australian Army
- Type: Infantry
- Size: ~3,500 men
- Part of: 5th Division (1916–19); 3rd Division (1921–45); 7th Division (January–July 1944)
- Engagements: World War I: Western Front; World War II: New Guinea campaign; Bougainville campaign

Commanders
- Notable commanders: Harold Elliott; Heathcote Hammer

Insignia
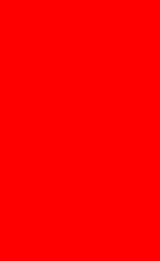
- Unit colour patch

The 15th Brigade was an infantry brigade of the Australian Army. Originally raised in 1912 as a Militia formation, the brigade was later re-raised in 1916 as part of the First Australian Imperial Force during World War I. The brigade took part in the fighting on the Western Front in France and Belgium during 1916–1918 before being disbanded in 1919. After this it was re-raised as a part-time unit of the Citizens Force in 1921 in Victoria. During World War II the brigade undertook defensive duties and training in Victoria and Queensland, before being deployed to New Guinea in 1943. Over the course of 1943 and 1944, it took part in the Salamaua–Lae, Markham–Ramu campaigns before returning to Australia in late 1944. In mid-1945, the brigade was committed to the Bougainville campaign, before being disbanded following the end of hostilities.

== History ==
The 15th Brigade traces its origins to 1912, when it was formed as a Militia brigade as part of the introduction of the compulsory training scheme, assigned to the 3rd Military District. At this time, the brigade's constituent units were located around Shepparton, Wangaratta, Seymour, Moonee Ponds, Ascot Vale, Coburg, Carlton and Newmarket.

=== World War I ===
The 15th Brigade was re-raised during World War I as part of the First Australian Imperial Force (AIF). Under the command of Brigadier General Harold Elliott, the brigade was formed as part of the expansion of the AIF that was undertaken in 1916 following the conclusion of the Gallipoli campaign. Drawing a cadre of experienced personnel who had fought during the Gallipoli campaign from the 2nd Brigade, the brigade was assigned to the 5th Division upon formation and was made up of four infantry battalions—the 57th, 58th, 59th and 60th Battalions. Meanwhile, after July 1916 it also consisted of the following supporting elements: 15th Field Company Engineers, 15th Machine Gun Company, 15th Light Trench Mortar Battery and the 15th Field Ambulance. Following the 5th Division's arrival in Europe, the brigade's first major action came at Fromelles in July 1916 when they and the British 184th Infantry Brigade were committed to attacking the German positions along the Laies River which were held by the 16th Bavarian Reserve Infantry Regiment. During the battle, two of the brigade's battalions—the 59th and 60th—were committed to the assault while the other two were held back in reserve. Of the two assault battalions, the 60th suffered the heaviest casualties, losing 16 officers and 741 men, while the 59th suffered 695 casualties.

For the next two and a half years the brigade saw service in the trenches along the Western Front in France and Flanders, taking part in actions at Bullecourt, Polygon Wood, Villers–Bretonneux and along the St Quentin Canal. Their final engagement came around Beaurevoir in late September and into early October 1918 when the Australians undertook operations to penetrate the German defences along the Hindenburg Line. During the brigade's final attacks, the brigade lost 32 officers and 489 men killed or wounded.

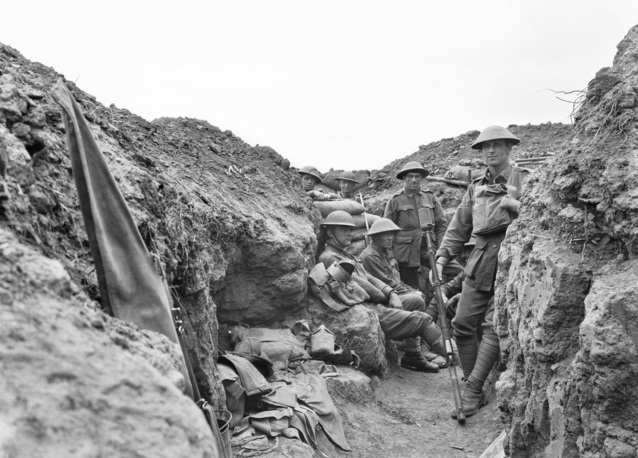
15th Brigade troops around Morlancourt, July 1918

Severely depleted and suffering from manpower shortages that was the result of the combined effect of a decrease in the number of volunteers arriving from Australia and the decision to grant home leave to men who had served for over four years, the Australian Corps was subsequently withdrawn from the line for rest on 5 October, upon a request from the Australian prime minister, Billy Hughes. When the Armistice came into effect on 11 November 1918, the Australians had not returned to the front and were still in the rear reorganising and training. With the end of hostilities, the demobilisation process began and men were slowly repatriated back to Australia. Eventually a number of the brigade's subordinate units were amalgamated, before ultimately being disbanded. On 26 March 1919, the final entry was made in the brigade's War Diary and the 15th Brigade was disbanded.

=== Inter-war years ===
In 1921, it was decided to perpetuate the numerical designations and honours of the AIF by re-organising the units of the Citizens Force. As a result, the brigade was reformed in Victoria as part of the 3rd Division on 1 May 1921. The brigade was based in Melbourne and regional Victoria at this time. Upon reformation the brigade consisted of four infantry battalions. These were the same battalions that had been allocated during the war and due to the revival of the compulsory training scheme they were quickly brought up to full strength. There was some variation, however, and indeed while the 59th Battalion had 1,444 men on its establishment, the 57th Battalion was the smallest in the 3rd Division, possessing just 702 members. Nevertheless, the following year the Army's budget was halved in response to the resolution of the Washington Naval Treaty which theoretically removed the threat to Australia posed by Japan, and as the scope of the compulsory training scheme was scaled back, the authorised strength of each battalion was reduced to just 409 men of all ranks, maintaining a skeleton organisation of just three companies.

In 1929, the situation was made worse by the complete suspension of the compulsory training scheme following the election of the Scullin Labor government. In its place a new system was introduced whereby the Citizens Force would be maintained on a part-time, voluntary basis only. It was also renamed the "Militia" at this time. The decision to suspend compulsory training, coupled with the economic downturn of the Great Depression meant that the manpower of many Militia units dropped considerably and as a result a number of units were amalgamated. By 1931, the 15th Brigade's authorised strength was reduced to 1,109 men, organised into three infantry battalions: the 58th, 59th and the 57th/60th Battalion, which had been merged the year before. Of these, only the 57th/60th could muster over 300 men, with an establishment of 331 personnel. At the same time 59th reported a strength of 281 men, while the 58th had 277.

Throughout the decade numbers remained low and training opportunities were, out of necessity, limited to home parades and an annual camp of just four days continuous training. From 1936 onwards attempts were made to improve the conditions of service and to reinvigorate the training program, while individual units began to undertake their own recruiting campaigns, however it was not until 1938, as tensions grew in Europe, that an attempt was made to expand the establishment of the Militia and a concerted effort to evaluate the readiness of individual units was undertaken at the annual camp that year. The 15th Brigade received considerable criticism following its camp, with the inspecting officer giving a negative review to all three infantry battalions, although the 58th was singled out for the harshest assessment. Throughout 1939 the process of expansion continued, nevertheless just prior to the outbreak of war in September, the brigade only consisted of 1,805 men in its three infantry battalions with the 57th/60th Battalion possessing about a third of the manpower that the 59th Battalion had.

=== World War II ===
At the outset of the World War II, due to the provisions of the Defence Act (1903) which prohibited sending the Militia to fight outside of Australian territory, the decision was made to raise an all volunteer force, the Second Australian Imperial Force (2nd AIF), for service overseas. As a result of this, the Militia units that already existed were used to provide a cadre of trained personnel upon which to raise the units of the 2nd AIF, as well as to administer the training of conscripts that were called up following the reinstitution of the compulsory training scheme in January 1940. They were also called up progressively to undertake brief periods of continuous service throughout 1940–1941 to improve overall military preparedness. Throughout 1941 the 15th Brigade, consisting of the 57th/60th, 58th and 59th Infantry Battalions, was stationed around Seymour, where it was mobilised for full time service following Japan's entry into the war. In early 1942, the brigade moved to Casino, New South Wales, to defend the northern New South Wales coast in the event of an invasion. In September 1942, the brigade moved to Caboolture, Queensland. At this time they were joined by the 24th Battalion after it was transferred to the 15th Brigade from the 10th Brigade, which had been disbanded during the partial demobilisation of Australian forces that was undertaken to rectify a manpower shortage that had developed within the Australian economy. As a result of the addition of the 24th Battalion, the 58th and 59th Battalions were amalgamated to form the 58th/59th Battalion, in order to maintain the triangular structure—24th, 57th/60th and 58th/59th—of the brigade. Attached also were the 15th Field Ambulance and the 15th Field Engineers.

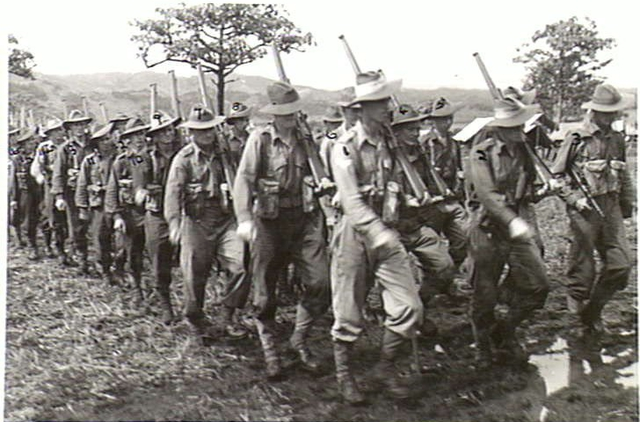
58th/59th Battalion in the Ramu Valley

In June 1943, command of the 15th Brigade was assumed by Brigadier Heathcote Hammer who had led with distinction as a battalion commander in North Africa, including at the First and the Second Battle of El Alamein. Hammer led the brigade until war's end. Later in 1943 the brigade was deployed to New Guinea. Its first fight involved the 24th and 58th/59th Battalions against the Japanese during the Salamaua–Lae campaign. Assigned a role in the feint against Salamaua, the brigade's most significant actions came in June and into July when they were involved in the fighting around Bobdubi Ridge. During this time the 57th/60th Battalion had been assigned to maintain a defensive perimeter for the US 871st Airborne Engineer Battalion, who were carving out a new airbase deep in the jungle at Tsili Tsili. At the end of the Salamaua–Lae campaign all units of the brigade were moved back to Port Moresby. In early 1944, the brigade was formed up for battle in its entirety and was attached to the 7th Division for its campaign in the Markham and Ramu valleys, arriving at Dumpu on 7 January to begin their advance. In February, after the fighting around the Kankiryo Saddle, the 15th Brigade moved up the Faria Valley to take over from the 18th Brigade. The brigade then proceeded to advance towards Madang as part of the 11th Division, which was reached on 24 April 1944.

In October 1944, after 16 months active service, the brigade returned to Australia for rest and reorganisation on the Atherton Tablelands in Queensland. By that time it had grown to a full brigade-group, consisting of a headquarters, three infantry battalions—the 24th, 57th/60th and 58th/59th Battalions—and supporting elements including a signals section, a flamethrower platoon, three troops of tanks from the 2/4th Armoured Regiment, a section of engineers from the 15th Field Company, a company from the 1st New Guinea Infantry Battalion, the 266th Light Aid Detachment, as well as military police, postal and dental units and a detachment from the Australian New Guinea Administrative Unit. Also in support was artillery from 5 Battery, 2nd Field Regiment and four 155 mm guns of 'U' Heavy Battery.

In April 1945, the 15th Brigade was sent to Bougainville to rejoin the 3rd Division where, supported by the guns of the 2/11th Field Regiment, it took part in the advance to the Hongorai River as well as the drive towards the Mivo before being relieved by the 29th Brigade on 1 July. Its losses while on Bougainville were heavier than any other Australian brigade that took part in the campaign, suffering 32 officers and 493 men killed or wounded.

=== Disbandment ===
Following the end of hostilities the 15th Brigade was disbanded in late 1945 as the demobilisation process was undertaken. Afterwards, in 1946, the decision was made to discard the existing army organisational structures and establish an 'interim force' until arrangements could be put in place for the post-war army. When the Citizens Military Force was re-raised in 1948, it was done so on a reduced establishment and the 15th Brigade was not reformed.
