= Alf Jackson =

Australian rules footballer and military officer

Personal information
- Full name: Alfred Jackson
- Born: 25 October 1887; Brunswick, Victoria
- Died: 21 September 1964 (aged 76); Bundoora, Victoria
- Original team: Melbourne Grammar

Playing career^{1}
Years	Club	Games (Goals)
1907, 1909	Essendon	13 (0)
- ^{1} Playing statistics correct to the end of 1909.

Career highlights
- AIF Pioneer Exhibition Game, London, 28 October 1916

Alfred Jackson OBE (25 October 1887 – 21 September 1964) was an Australian military officer and an Australian rules footballer who played for the Essendon Football Club in the Victorian Football League (VFL).

== Family ==
The son of Alfred Jackson (1858-1901), and Sarah Ann Jackson (1860-1952), née Williams, later Mrs Fisenden, Alfred Jackson was born in Brunswick, Victoria on 25 October 1887.

== Football ==
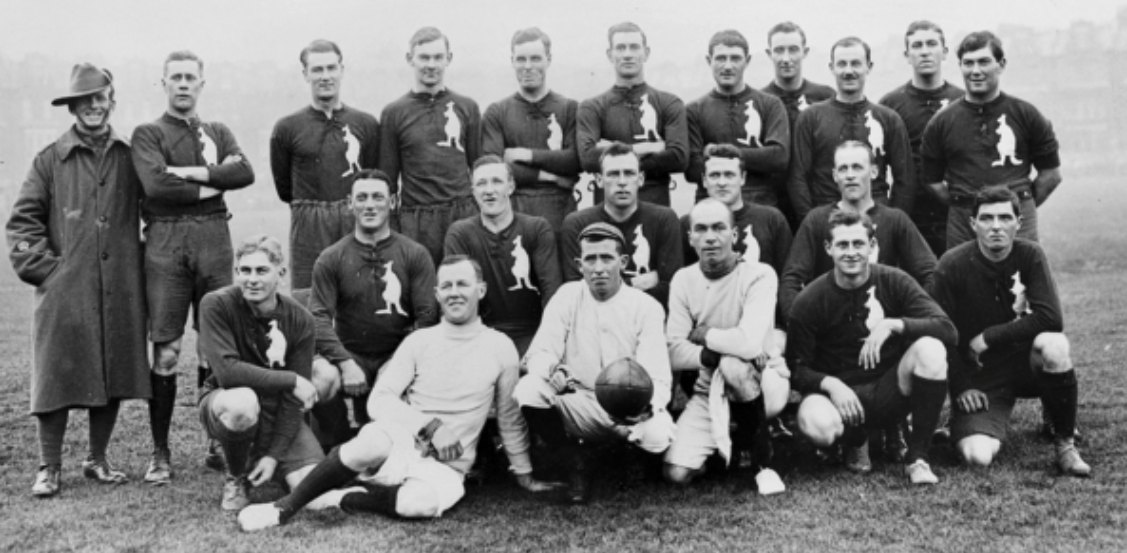
The Australian Training Units Team: 28 October 1916. Alf Jackson is the second from the right in the middle row.

=== Training Units team (AIF) ===
He played for the (losing) Australian Training Units team in the famous "Pioneer Exhibition Game" of Australian Rules football, held in London, in October 1916. A news film was taken at the match.

== Military service ==
Jackson joined the Army in 1911 and applied for a commission at the commencement of World War I. He served at Gallipoli, being concussed and shot in action, but returned to the Peninsula after treatment in Malta and took over command of the 7th Battalion.

He was subsequently transferred to France, promoted to lieutenant colonel and assumed command of the 60th Battalion, being involved in the Battle of Fromelles in June 1916. In July 1917 he assumed command of the 58th Battalion and later commanded various training units until the end of the war.

He was Mentioned in Despatches in 1918 and appointed as an Officer of the Order of the British Empire in 1919.

In World War II, Jackson served as a Lieutenant Colonel in the 3rd Ambulance Brigade.

== See also ==
- 1916 Pioneer Exhibition Game
