= MV Duntroon =

20th century Australian passenger motor vessel

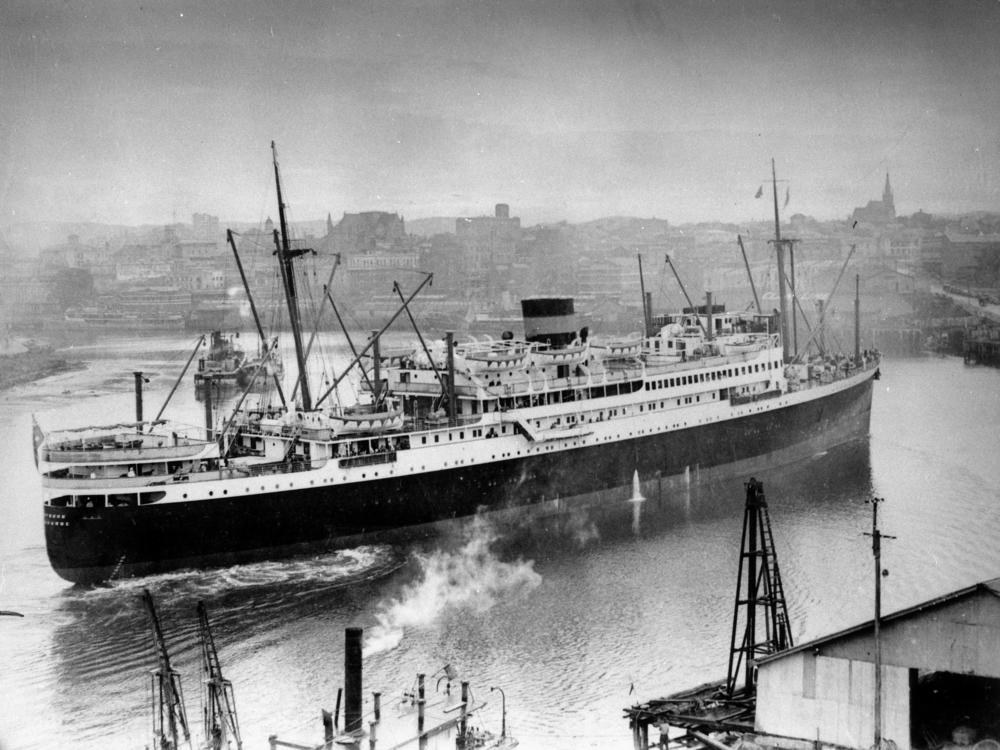
- Duntroon

History
- Name: Duntroon
- Owner: Melbourne Steamship Company
- Port of registry: Melbourne
- Builder: Swan, Hunter & Wigham Richardson, Walker
- Yard number: 1460
- Launched: 4 April 1935
- Completed: August 1935
- In service: 1935
- Out of service: 1942
- Identification: UK official number 159556; call sign VLFB
- Fate: Requisitioned by Army

History

Australia
- In service: 1942
- Out of service: 1949
- Fate: Returned to civilian service
- Notes: Army control 1942–46; Chartered by RAN 1946–49

History
- Name: Duntroon (Melbourne Steamship Company); Tong Hoo (Kie Hock Shipping Co.); Lydia (Africa Shipping Co.)
- In service: 1950–60 (Melbourne Steamship Company); 1961–66 (Kie Hock Shipping Co.); 1966–67 (Africa Shipping Co.)
- Fate: Scrapped 1968

General characteristics
- Type: passenger ship
- Tonnage: 10,346 GRT, 6,137 NRT
- Length: 455.0 ft (138.7 m)
- Beam: 65.2 ft (19.9 m)
- Depth: 30.2 ft (9.2 m)
- Installed power: 1,288 NHP
- Propulsion: 2 × 6-cylinder diesel engines; 2 × screws
- Capacity: 373 passengers
- Sensors & processing systems: wireless direction finding; echo sounding device

MV Duntroon was a passenger motor ship built for the Melbourne Steamship Company, that saw military service as a troopship between 1942 and 1949. She was built by Swan, Hunter & Wigham Richardson, Walker, Newcastle upon Tyne, and entered service in 1939.

At the start of World War II, Duntroon was requisitioned for conversion into an armed merchant cruiser, but was returned as unsuitable. In November 1940, Duntroon collided with and sank the auxiliary minesweeper HMAS Goorangai; the RAN's first loss of the war. In February 1942, Duntroon was requisitioned by the Australian Army for use as a troopship. The ship was involved in a second fatal collision in November 1943, sinking the destroyer USS Perkins. Her army service continued until 1946, when she was chartered by the RAN for transport duties with the British Commonwealth Occupation Force.

Duntroon was returned to her civilian owners in 1950. In 1961, the ship was sold to Kie Hock Shipping Co. and renamed Tong Hoo. She was sold again in 1966 to Africa Shipping Co. and renamed Lydia. The ship was laid up in Singapore in 1967, and sailed to Taiwan for scrapping in 1968.

== Building ==
Swan, Hunter & Wigham Richardson built the ship at Wallsend in 1935 for the Melbourne Steamship Company of Australia. She was launched on 4 April 1935 and completed in August. She was designed for the East – West Australian coastal passenger service, from Melbourne to Adelaide and Fremantle.

Duntroon had twin screws. Each was driven by a six-cylinder, two-stroke, double-acting diesel engine. The combined power output of the two engines was 1,288 nominal horsepower.

== Operational history ==
=== Melbourne Steamship Company ===
Duntroon operated as a passenger transport until the start of World War II, when she was requisitioned for conversion into an armed merchant cruiser on 12 October 1939. The ship was found to be unsuitable for the role, and was returned to her owners on 3 November.

On the evening of 20 November 1940, Duntroon departed from Melbourne to begin a voyage to Port Adelaide and Fremantle. At 20:37, while attempting to exit Port Phillip Bay, Duntroon collided with the blacked-out auxiliary minesweeper HMAS Goorangai, which was sailing to Portsea to anchor for the night. The smaller ship was cut in two, and all 24 aboard were killed: the first RAN losses of World War II. Duntroon attempted to recover survivors, but was only successful in finding six bodies. The ship returned to Melbourne for bow repairs, which were completed on 18 December. Duntroon's captain was later exonerated of any blame for the accident.

During late December 1941 and early January 1942, Duntroon was used to relocate captured officers from the German auxiliary cruiser Kormoran from Fremantle to Murchison, Victoria.

=== Military service ===
In February 1942, Duntroon was requisitioned by the Australian Army. Duntroon was one of two Australian transports, the other being Katoomba, that were substituted for SS Mariposa to transport a U.S. Army fighter group's ground troops and equipment to India. The troops and crated P-40 pursuit aircraft had arrived in a convoy from San Francisco escorted by USS Phoenix, with Mariposa and the United States Army Transport Willard A. Holbrook intended to continue on to India; however, Mariposa was withdrawn and the Australian transports substituted. Phoenix, with Duntroon, Katoomba, and Holbrook, departed Melbourne on 12 February as convoy MS.5 bound for Colombo, Ceylon by way of Fremantle. There, USS Langley and Sea Witch joined with a cargo of aircraft for Java, and the convoy departed Fremantle on 22 February. Langley and Sea Witch left the convoy to proceed independently to Java on 23 February, while the remaining ships continued under Phoenix's escort until that cruiser was relieved by HMS Enterprise on 28 February, about 300 miles west of Cocos Island. The convoy arrived at Colombo on 5 March.

Duntroon transported elements of the Second Australian Imperial Force such as the 2/16th Battalion and others from the Middle East and some Asian theatres of war back to Australia before commencing operations in the South West Pacific and Far East. This included strategic transportation of battalion-strength bodies of troops (such as the 57th/60th Battalion), equipment and supplies from Australia to the South West Pacific theatre of war, and movement of troops around the islands of that region.

Duntroon was involved in a second collision in November 1943, this time with United States Navy destroyer USS Perkins. The destroyer was sailing from Milne Bay to Buna when she was rammed portside amidships and cut in two by Duntroon just before 02:00 on 29 November, 2 nautical miles (3.7 km; 2.3 mi) from Ipoteto Island (S9.6301, E150.0219). Nine Americans were killed, and one injured. A court of inquiry, held in San Francisco the following month, later held the captain of Perkins accountable for the incident, along with his executive officer and officer-of-the-deck.

After being repaired, Duntroon returned to service, and between 24 and 28 December 1944, she transported the 58th/59th Battalion from Julago, Queensland to Torokina, Bougainville.

After the war's end, in 1946, Duntroon was used to transport prisoner of war reception units (medical teams, etc.) to Singapore to safely collect and recuperate former prisoners of war before repatriating the prisoners back to Australia.

Throughout her wartime career she transported over 170,000 troops. The ship left Army service in April 1946, but was chartered by the RAN three months later. While in RAN service, Duntroon was used to transport personnel of the British Commonwealth Occupation Force between Japan and Australia until late 1948.

=== Return to civilian service ===
Duntroon was returned to her owners in 1946, and resumed coastal passenger and cruising services in January, 1947, sailing from Sydney to Fremantle via Melbourne and Adelaide. One of her engines broke down off Cape Leeuwin WA during this voyage slowing her down to 6 knots. On 23 October 1950, she was damaged by fire while berthed in the Yarra River. In 1960, Duntroon was sold to the Grosvenor Shipping Co. and was towed to Hong Kong by the tug Ajax. The ship's bell was removed; this was later installed on the parade ground of the Royal Military College Duntroon, in Canberra. She was resold to Kie Hock Shipping Co. in 1961 and was renamed Tong Hoo and used on the Hong Kong–Indonesia passenger service. Tong Hoo was sold in 1966 to the Africa Shipping Co., renamed Lydia and used for the India – Pakistan – East Africa route.

== Fate ==
In 1967 she was laid up at Singapore. On 22 September 1968 she arrived at Kaohsiung, Taiwan to be scrapped.
