= Charles Vincent Watson =

Australian military officer (1882–1930)

Lieutenant-Colonel Charles Vincent Watson, D.S.O., V.D., L. de H. (2 June 1882 – 10 February 1930) was an Australian military officer during the First World War. He was an officer of the Commonwealth Patent Office for 25 years, and a highly-regarded Commissioner of Patents. He was well-known as a man about town, prominent in Melbourne's sporting and club circles.

== Early life ==
Watson was born in Horsham, Victoria to George Rolleston Watson and Catherine Elizabeth Watson, née Donnelly. He was educated at Xavier College, Kew, and trained as an architect with the Victorian Public Works Department. In 1905 he transferred to the Commonwealth Public Service, as assistant examiner in the Patents Office, a branch of the Attorney-General's Department.

== Military career ==
In 1907 Watson joined the 5th Australian Infantry Regiment. He was in put charge of various officers' training schools, and commanded the German internment camp at Holsworthy, New South Wales. He embarked with the First AIF as a major in July, 1917, and served with the 5th Infantry Brigade. He commanded the 58th Battalion from May 1918 till December 1918, was twice mentioned in dispatches and was awarded the D.S.O. As Colonel Watson he received the bar to his D.S.O. decoration for conspicuous gallantry and good leadership in the attack on the Hindenburg line near Bullecourt in 1918. He was appointed Assistant Provost Marshal in London in December, 1918, and held that appointment until October, 1919. On his return to Australia he commanded the 58th Battalion (Essendon Rifles), the parent unit of which he commanded in the A.I.F. In April 1924 he was appointed commander of the 15th Infantry Brigade. Watson was awarded the French Légion d'honneur for his services.

== Return to public service ==
While still chairman of the board he was appointed Deputy Commissioner of Patents, Deputy Registrar of Trade Marks, and Deputy Registrar of Designs in January, 1921. In November 1923 he succeeded Robert G. Ferguson as Commissioner of Patents. The Patents Department developed greatly under Watson, later handling 7,000 patent applications and 3,000 trade marks a year; on a population basis the largest businesses of its kind in the world. When he returned from the war he was appointed chair man of the Central War Gratuities Board. His services on the board were highly praised by the Treasurer, Sir Joseph Cook.

== Last years ==
Watson was one of Melbourne's personalities, and was prominent in sporting, and club life. His height and good physique gave him a distinguished appearance. He was a committeeman of the Naval and Military Club, and a member of several others, including the Athenaeum Club.

On 1 February 1930, Watson sustained an injury on a moored raft while bathing near Frankston. He took to his bed and appendicitis developed. He was taken to a private hospital in Melbourne for the operation, and died subsequently. His remains were interred with military honours at Box Hill Cemetery.
