= HMAS Goorangai =

Auxiliary minesweeper of the Royal Australian Navy

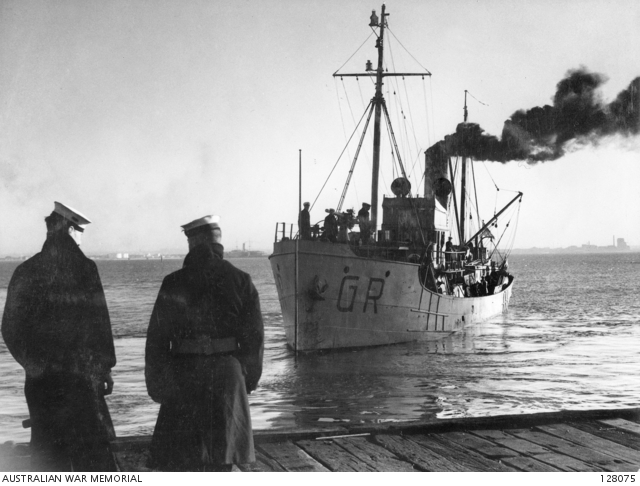
- Goorangai coming in to berth

History

Australia
- Name: Goorangai
- Operator: Government of New South Wales (1919–1926); Cam & Sons (1926–1939)
- Builder: Government Dockyard, Newcastle
- Launched: 1919
- Fate: Requisition for naval service, 1939

History

Australia
- Acquired: 8 August 1939
- Commissioned: 9 September 1939
- Reclassified: Auxiliary minesweeper
- Fate: Sunk following collision in 1940
- Notes: Pennant number: GR

General characteristics
- Type: Auxiliary minesweeper (former trawler)
- Tonnage: 223 GRT
- Length: 117 feet (36 m)
- Beam: 22 feet 1 inch (6.73 m)
- Draught: 13 feet 8 inches (4.17 m)
- Speed: 9.5 knots (17.6 km/h; 10.9 mph)
- Complement: 3 officers, 21 sailors
- Armament: 1 × QF 12-pounder 12 cwt naval gun; Depth charges

HMAS Goorangai was a 223-ton auxiliary minesweeper of the Royal Australian Navy (RAN). She was built in 1919 for the Government of New South Wales, and sold in 1926 to the fishing company Cam & Sons, being converted into a trawler. Following the outbreak of World War II, the vessel was requisitioned for military service, converted into a minesweeper, and assigned to Melbourne. She was sunk in an accidental collision with MV Duntroon in 1940, becoming the RAN's first loss of World War II, and the first RAN surface ship to be lost in wartime service.

== Construction ==
Goorangai was built by the Government Dockyard, Newcastle in 1919, for use by the Government of New South Wales. The vessel measured 223 GRT, was 117 feet (36 m) long, had a beam of 22 feet 1 inch (6.73 m), and a draught of 13 feet 8 inches (4.17 m). Top speed was 9.5 knots (17.6 km/h; 10.9 mph).

== Operational history ==
The vessel was in government service until 1926, when she was sold to Sydney-based fishing company Cam & Sons for use as a trawler.

At the start of World War II, Goorangai was requisitioned for military service on 8 September 1939, one of eight vessels requisitioned from Cam & Sons during the war. The vessel underwent modification, and was fitted with mine-sweeping gear, a QF 12-pounder 12 cwt naval gun, and depth charges. After conversion into an auxiliary minesweeper, Goorangai was commissioned into the RAN on 9 September 1939, and assigned the pennant number GR. She was operated by Royal Australian Navy Reserve personnel: 21 sailors and 3 officers. Goorangai was assigned to Minesweeping Group 54, which was based in Melbourne and tasked with keeping Bass Strait and surrounding waters clear of mines.

Following the loss of SS Cambridge and MS City of Rayville in November 1940 to sea mines laid off Wilsons Promontory and Cape Otway, Goorangai and two other auxiliary minesweepers, HMA Ships Orara and Durraween, were sent to clear to Bass Strait to sweep for mines.

=== Collision and loss ===
On the night of 20 November, Goorangai was crossing the mouth of Port Phillip Bay to anchor at Portsea for the night. The minesweeper was sailing under "brownout" conditions, with minimal lighting. At 20:37, MV Duntroon, en route to Sydney, emerged from Port Phillip Bay and cut Goorangai in two. The small auxiliary sank within a minute, taking all 24 personnel aboard with her. Only six bodies were recovered, one of which couldn't be identified. Goorangai and her ship's company were the RAN's first loss in World War II, and the first RAN surface ship ever to be sunk while in service.

News of the accident quickly spread in Melbourne. Because media outlets decided that the loss of life was due to an accident and not military action, censorship restrictions did not reply. The Australian Commonwealth Naval Board disagreed, and the War Cabinet later issued supplementary instructions preventing the publishing of any loss of Australian personnel or equipment without approval. Because the wreck was inside the shipping zone and resting in less than 15 metres (49 ft) of water, it was destroyed by explosives in January 1941. The Court of Marine Inquiry initially found both ships to be at fault for the collision, but later exonerated the captain of Duntroon, because the main cause of the accident was determined to be poor positioning of lights on the minesweeper. That led the captain of Duntroon to believe that his vessel was on a parallel course with Goorangai.

=== Memorials ===
A memorial cairn was erected at Queenscliff in 1981. The ship was recognised under the Historic Ship Wrecks Act on 16 November 1995. In 2004, the Royal Australian Naval Professional Studies Program initiated a series of occasional papers focusing on subjects related to the Naval Reserve: the series was named Goorangai, after the ship.

A memorial plaque, dedicated to HMAS Goorangai and her Tasmanian RAN personnel, has been erected at the Tasmanian Seafarers' Memorial at Triabunna, on the east coast of Tasmania.

== Dive site ==
In January 1941, blasting reduced the wreckage to sections of structural plating up to 2 m high, a small cylindrical boiler, and bits of scattered broken machinery. The wreckage has been heavily overgrown with encrusting invertebrates, and there prolific fish and mobile invertebrate life. It covers some 200 m^{2} of sandy seabed in the South Channel, and anchoring there is prohibited. Strong tidal currents make timing important for those diving at the site.

Location: Latitude: 38° 17.404′ S, Longitude: 144° 40.992′ E, Datum: WGS84, depth 13 to 15 m.
