= 58th/59th Battalion (Australia) =

Australian Army infantry battalion

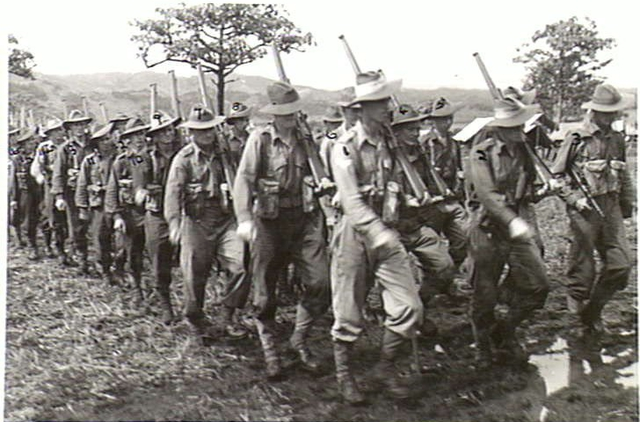
- Men from the 58th/59th Battalion in the Ramu Valley, January 1944
- Active: 1942–46
- Country: Australia
- Branch: Australian Army
- Type: Infantry
- Size: ~800–900 men (Note: At the start of the war, the normal size of an Australian infantry battalion was 910 men all ranks, however, following the reorganisation of the 3rd Division along the jungle establishment, the size dropped to 803 men all ranks.)
- Part of: 15th Brigade, 3rd Division
- Nicknames: Essendon, Coburg, Brunswick/ Hume Regiment
- Colours: Purple alongside red
- Engagements: Second World War: New Guinea campaign; Bougainville campaign

Insignia
- Unit colour patch

The 58th/59th Battalion was an infantry battalion of the Australian Army which served during the Second World War. Raised in 1942 as part of the Militia through the amalgamation of the 58th and 59th Battalions, it formed part of the 15th Brigade, assigned to the 3rd Division. Initially the battalion undertook defensive duties in Australia before being deployed to New Guinea where it took part in the fighting around Salamaua and Lae and then the Finisterre Range campaign. In 1945 they were sent to Bougainville where they took part in the fighting in the southern sector of the island. Following the end of the war, the battalion was disbanded in 1946.

== History ==
Formed on 27 August 1942 by the amalgamation of two previously existing Militia battalions from Victoria—the 58th Battalion and 59th Battalion—the 58th/59th Battalion formed part of the 15th Brigade, assigned to the 3rd Division. Upon formation, the battalion adopted the territorial title of the "Essendon, Coburg, Brunswick/Hume Regiment". The battalion's first commanding officer was Lieutenant Colonel Rupert Whalley. Although a Militia unit and therefore subject to restrictions on where they could be deployed under the Defence Act (1903), because more than 65 per cent of its personnel volunteered for overseas service the 58th/59th Battalion was one of the 32 Militia infantry battalions to receive Australian Imperial Force (AIF) status during the war, thus allowing it to be deployed outside of Australian territory.

Nevertheless, when the battalion was deployed overseas in 1943 after undertaking defensive duties in the Tweed Valley in New South Wales and training at Caboolture, Queensland, they were sent to New Guinea where they arrived in Port Moresby in March. They subsequently took part in the fighting around Lae and Salamaua, during which time they advanced up the Missim Trail from Bulwa, before launching an attack on a heavily fortified Japanese position on Bobdubi Ridge on 30 June 1943. From there the battalion went on to capture "Old Vickers", which was a key to the Allies taking Salamaua.

After the capture of Lae in September, the battalion was withdrawn from the line after a period of 77 days of continuous combat operations. Moving back to Port Moresby, they remained there until January 1944 when they were recommitted to the fighting, being placed under the command of the 7th Division along with the rest of the 15th Brigade for the advance through the Markham and Ramu Valleys and into the Finisterre Range. In February, after fighting around the Kankiryo Saddle, the 15th Brigade moved up the Faria Valley to take over from the 18th Brigade and the 58th/59th Battalion relieved the 2/10th Battalion on the eastern side of the saddle. The brigade then advanced towards Madang, which was reached on 24 April 1944.

After this the battalion returned to Australia, having been deployed for almost eighteen months, and after period of leave, the battalion reformed on the Atherton Tablelands in Queensland in October 1944. A period of re-organisation and training took place, however, it did not last too long as in November–December the 3rd Division, less the 15th Brigade, was sent to Bougainville to take over from the American garrison there.

Early in 1945 the 15th Brigade was also sent to the island and in April 1945 they took over the advance in the southern sector from the 7th Brigade. The 15th Brigade continued the advance along the axis of the Buin Road, crossing the Hongorai, Hari and Mobiai rivers before being relieved on 1 July by the 29th Brigade. During this time the 58th/59th took part in the Battle of the Hongorai River, as well as the advance to the Mivo, alternating with the 24th Battalion to lead the brigade's main drive towards Buin, where the main Japanese forces were concentrated.

Following the brigade's relief in July, the battalion did not see combat again before the war came to an end. After the end of hostilities the demobilisation process began and the battalion's numbers slowly decreased as men were returned to Australia for demobilisation and discharge or were transferred to other units for subsequent service. On 23 February 1946 the battalion was disbanded. During their service during the war, the battalion lost 136 men killed or died on active service and 306 men wounded. Members of the battalion received the following decorations: one MBE, one Distinguished Service Order, 12 Military Crosses with one bar, 16 Military Medals and 30 Mentioned in Despatches. (Note: The battalion's official historian, Russell Mathews, lists one MBE, one DSO, 12 MCs with one bar, 16 MMs and 31 MIDs.)

Following the war, when Australia's part-time military forces were re-raised under the guise of the Citizens Military Force (CMF) in 1948, the battalion's honours and traditions were perpetuated by the 58th/32nd Battalion (Essendon Regiment). Later as the CMF was re-organised this unit became part of the Royal Victoria Regiment and today the 58th/59th is perpetuated by the 8th/7th Battalion, Royal Victoria Regiment.

== Commanding officers ==
The following officers commanded the battalion:

- Lieutenant Colonel Rupert Whalley (August 1942 – January 1943)
- Lieutenant Colonel Patrick Starr (April 1943 – September 1943)
- Lieutenant Colonel George Warfe (September 1943 – January 1945)
- Lieutenant Colonel William Mayberry (January 1945 – October 1945)

== Battle honours ==
For their service during the Second World War, the 58th/59th Battalion received the following battle honours:

- South-West Pacific 1943–45, Bobdubi I, Bobdubi II, Komiatum, Liberation of Australian New Guinea, Finisterres, Hongorai River, Egan's Ridge–Hongorai Ford, Hari River, Ogorata River, Mivo Ford, Barum, Mobiai River.

== Notes ==
Footnotes

Citations
