= 24th Battalion (Australia) =

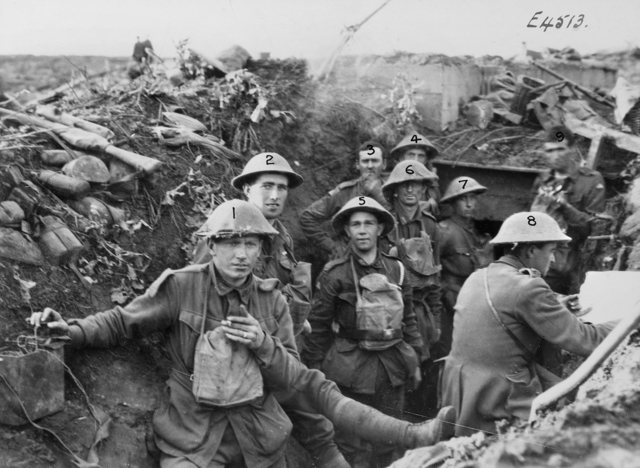
- Battalion Headquarters, Broodseinde Ridge, October 1917
- Active: 1915–1919; 1921–1946
- Country: Australia
- Branch: Australian Army
- Type: Infantry
- Role: Line infantry
- Size: ~800–1,000 men (Note: During World War I the size of an infantry battalion was 1,023 men all ranks. During World War II, following the reorganisation of the 3rd Division along the jungle establishment, the size dropped to 803 men all ranks.)
- Part of: 6th Brigade; 15th Brigade
- Colours: White over red
- Engagements: World War I: Gallipoli campaign; Western Front; World War II: New Guinea campaign; Bougainville campaign

Insignia
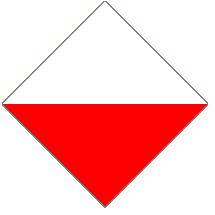
- Unit colour patch

The 24th Battalion was an infantry battalion of the Australian Army. Originally raised in 1915 for service during World War I as part of the 1st Australian Imperial Force, it was attached to the 6th Brigade, 2nd Division and served during the Gallipoli campaign and in the trenches of the Western Front in France and Belgium. Following the end of the war the battalion was disbanded in 1919, however, in 1921 it was re-raised as a unit of the part-time Citizens Forces in Melbourne, Victoria. In 1927, when the part-time forces adopted territorial titles, the battalion adopted the designation of 24th Battalion (Kooyong Regiment). In 1939, the 24th Battalion was merged with the 39th Battalion, however, they were split up in 1941 and in 1943, after being allocated to the 15th Brigade, the 24th Battalion was deployed to New Guinea before later taking part in the Bougainville campaign. Following the end of the war, the battalion was disbanded in 1946.

== History ==
=== World War I ===
The 24th Battalion was raised in May 1915 at Broadmeadows Camp in Victoria, as a unit of the all-volunteer Australian Imperial Force (AIF). Along with the 21st, 22nd and 23rd Battalion, the 24th formed part of the 6th Brigade, which was assigned to the 2nd Division. It had originally been planned that the battalion would be raised from personnel drawn from outside of Victoria and it was designated as an "outer states" battalion meaning that it would draw its recruits from the less populous states of Queensland, Tasmania, South Australia and Western Australia; however, due to the large number of recruits that had arrived at Broadmeadows at the time it was decided to raise the battalion there, from Victorian volunteers. As a result of the hasty decision to raise the battalion very little training was carried out before the battalion sailed from Melbourne just a week after being formed.

Organised into four rifle companies, designated 'A' through to 'D', with a machine gun section in support, the battalion had an authorised strength of 1,023 men of all ranks. After arriving in Egypt, the 24th completed its training during July and August before being sent to Gallipoli in early September as reinforcements for the forces that had landed there in April. Arriving on the peninsula on 4 September, the 24th served in the Lone Pine sector, taking over responsibility for the front line on the 12 September. The position was very close to the Turkish trenches and was hotly contested. The position was so tenuous, that the troops holding it had to be rotated regularly, and as a result the 24th spent the remainder of the campaign rotating with the 23rd Battalion to hold the position against determined Turkish mining operations. The battalion remained at Gallipoli for three months until the evacuation of Allied troops took place in December 1915. During the period that the 24th was deployed to Gallipoli, a 52-man detachment was sent to Salonika to act as packhorse handlers for the British contingent.

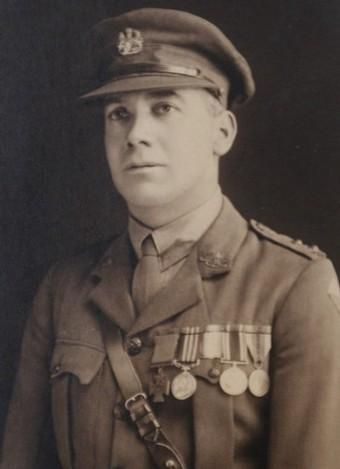
George Ingram who received the 24th Battalion's only Victoria Cross for his actions at Beaurevoir in October 1918

Following this they returned to Egypt where they took part in the defence of the Suez Canal. In early 1916, the AIF was reorganised and expanded, to prepare it for further operations. In March 1916, the AIF's infantry divisions began transferring to France and Belgium to serve in the trenches of the Western Front. Their first major action in France came at Pozières and Mouquet Farm in July and August 1916, after which over the next two-and-a-half years the 24th Battalion took part in many of the major battles undertaken by the Australians in Europe. In 1917, after the Germans shortened their lines and withdrew to the Hindenburg Line, in May the 24th took part in the Second Battle of Bullecourt where the battalion suffered over 80 per cent casualties, before later in the year attacking around Broodseinde.

In 1918, despite being severely depleted, it played a defensive role during the German spring offensive before supporting the attack at Hamel in July. In August, it joined the Allied Hundred Days Offensive, attacking around Amiens, and then joining the advance that followed. In early October 1918, the battalion attacked the Beaurevoir and then Montbrehain. It was during this final attack, on 5 October, that one of the battalion's subalterns, George Ingram, performed the deeds that resulted in him being awarded the Victoria Cross. At the conclusion of the battle, the 24th was withdrawn from the line for rest and reorganisation and did not take part in further combat before the war came to an end on 11 November 1918. Its strength dwindled as the demobilisation process began and personnel were repatriated back to Australia, and the 24th Battalion was disbanded in May 1919. During its service during World War I the battalion lost 909 men killed and 2,494 men wounded. A total of 19 battle honours were bestowed upon the 24th Battalion in 1927 for its involvement in the war.

=== Inter war years ===
In 1921, the decision was made to perpetuate the numerical designations and battle honours of the AIF by re-raising the AIF units as part of the Citizens Forces (later renamed the "Militia"). To a large extent most of these units were raised in the areas from where their personnel had been drawn during the war, thus maintaining their regional links in the process. This was achieved by amalgamating the 2nd and 3rd Battalions of the 24th Infantry Regiment, and subsuming part of the 29th Light Horse Regiment to form a single battalion, The 24th Battalion was raised in Victoria with its headquarters in Surrey Hills, with detachments spread out around the area including depots at Camberwell, Box Hill, Upper Hawthorn, Ringwood and Belgrave. In 1927, territorial designations were adopted by the Citizens Forces and the battalion became known as the 24th Battalion (Kooyong Regiment); the battalion's motto – "I Hold Fast" – was also approved at this time.

Initially, the battalion was manned through a mixture of voluntary and compulsory service; however, in 1929 the Scullin Labor government abolished the compulsory service scheme and replaced it with the all-volunteer Militia. As a result of this, the battalion's strength fell significantly, but it was maintained through recruitment drives. In June 1939, the battalion was merged with the 39th Battalion to become the 24th/39th Battalion and was assigned to the 10th Brigade, 3rd Division.

=== World War II ===
At the outset of the World War II, due to the provisions of the Defence Act (1903) which prohibited sending the Militia to fight outside of Australian territory, (Note: This stipulation also applied to the 2,800 strong Permanent Military Force also. Of the 32 Militia battalions that saw active service during the war, all but three were given AIF status. Essentially this meant that as more than 65 per cent of their wartime establishment had volunteered for service overseas, the battalion could be sent anywhere, including outside of Australian territory. The 24th Battalion was one of the 29 battalions to receive this status.) the decision was made to raise an all volunteer force to serve overseas—initial operations were conceived to be likely in the Middle East, France and later possibly the United Kingdom—while it was decided that the Militia would be used to defend the Australian mainland and to improve Australia's overall level of readiness through the reinstitution of compulsory military service and extended periods of continuous periods of training.

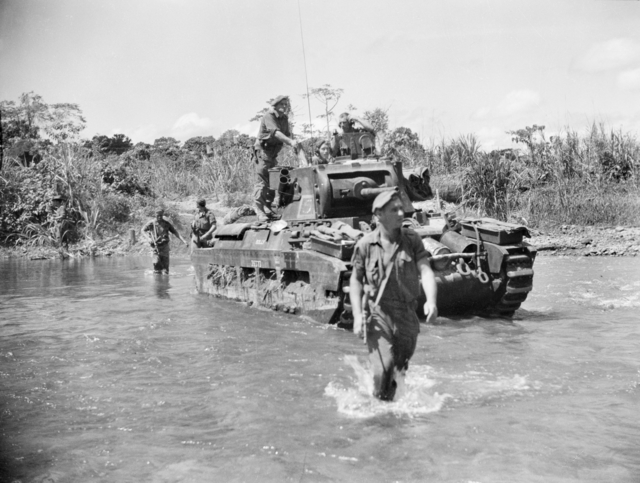
Troops from the 24th Battalion cross the Hongorai River alongside Matilda tanks from the 2/4th Armoured Regiment in May 1945

During this time the 24th/39th Battalion undertook a number of periods of continuous training, firstly in September 1939 when a company-sized element exercised at Trawool for a month. In January 1940, the whole battalion was called up for a three-month training period, again at Trawool as the battalion's strength was increased through the arrival of men called up through the compulsory training scheme. A further camp was undertaken between December 1940 and April 1941, this time at Nagambie Road, near Seymour in central Victoria. This was followed by another between August and October 1941, after which the battalion was called up to full-time service for the duration of the war. During this period, the decision was made to split the 24th/39th Battalion to reform its component units. Following Japan's entry into the war, the 39th Battalion was sent to New Guinea and would go on to play a key role in the Australian defensive actions along the Kokoda Track in July and August 1942.

Meanwhile, in May 1942, the 24th Battalion was moved to Queensland and then, in September, following the disbandment of the 10th Brigade, the 24th was transferred to the 15th Brigade. In 1943, the battalion was deployed to New Guinea aboard the transport Duntroon along with the rest of the 3rd Division, arriving in Port Moresby over the course of three months between February and April. Later, they were transported by air to the Wau Valley and sent to take part in the fighting around Bobdubi Ridge and Mount Tambu before patrolling the Wampit Valley during the Salamaua–Lae campaign. The official war historian, Gavin Long, recognised the fundamental importance of what he called "Wampit Force", largely the 24th Battalion, in the overall prosecution by the Allies of the war in New Guinea, in particular because of its role in protecting the Allied air forces while they gained air superiority in New Guinea.

Later, in September 1943, the battalion attacked Markham Point, before being detached to the 7th Division for the Finisterre Range campaign, during which they moved from Nadzab to Dumpu and helped to clear the Ramu Valley in early 1944, securing the 15th Brigade's western flank as the Australians pushed the advance towards Madang, which was secured in April 1944 by the 57th/60th Battalion.

In August 1944, the 24th Battalion was withdrawn back to Australia, embarking aboard the transport Van Heutsz at Madang, for rest and reorganization. Disembarking in Townsville, the soldiers were sent on home leave until early October.

After the soldiers returned from leave, a period of re-organisation and training followed on the Atherton Tablelands before the 24th Battalion deployed with the rest of the 15th Brigade to Bougainville in April 1945. On Bougainville, as part of the 3rd Division, the battalion took part in the drive to Buin in the southern sector, leading the advance to the Hongorai River along the Buin Road in April and early May, during which time they were involved in several small unit actions. Further actions were fought by the battalion around Egan's Ridge and Mayberry's Crossing in mid-May as the battalion crossed the Pororei River. The Buin Road was cleared south towards the Peperu River, while the lateral track north to Oso was also cleared. In mid-June, after bypassing Unani along a lateral track that passed behind Monoitu, the battalion was involved in actions around the Hari and the Ogorata Rivers, pushing towards Kingori and then on to Katsuwa along the Commando Road, crossing the Mobiai. Eventually they reached the Mivo River which was forded by early July. Shortly afterwards, the battalion was relieved by units of the 29th Brigade who continued the drive south after a defensive battle against a Japanese counter-attack.

The war ended shortly afterwards, but the 24th Battalion remained on Bougainville until December 1945 when they were brought back to Australia. Following demobilisation, the battalion was disbanded on 19 January 1946. During its active service it lost 85 men killed and 184 wounded. Members of the battalion received the following decorations: two Distinguished Service Orders, two Members of the Order of the British Empire, eight Military Crosses and one Bar, six Distinguished Conduct Medals, 16 Military Medals, one British Empire Medal, two George Medals, 10 Efficiency Medals, two Efficiency Decorations, and 33 Mentions in Despatches. In 1961 the battalion was awarded eleven battle honours for its direct involvement in the war. At the same time it was also entrusted with those awarded to the 2/24th Battalion.

== Commanding officers ==
The following officers served as commanding officer of the 24th Battalion:

World War I

- Lieutenant Colonel William Walker Russell Watson;
- Lieutenant Colonel William Edward James.

Inter-war years

- Lieutenant Colonel Charles Reginald Miles Cox;
- Lieutenant Colonel Aubrey Roy Liddon Wiltshire;
- Lieutenant Colonel Stanley Savige
- Lieutenant Colonel Theodore Walker.

World War II

- Lieutenant Colonel Theodore Gordon Walker;
- Lieutenant Colonel Allan Spowers;
- Lieutenant Colonel Alexander Hugh Falconer;
- Lieutenant Colonel George Frederick Smith;
- Lieutenant Colonel Arthur Jeffery Anderson.

== Battle honours ==
For its service during World War I and World War II, the 24th Battalion received the following battle honours. These battle honours are maintained by the 5th/6th Battalion, Royal Victoria Regiment:

- World War I: Gallipoli 1915, Egypt 1915–16, Somme 1916–18, Pozières, Bapaume 1917, Bullecourt, Ypres 1917, Menin Road, Polygon Wood, Broodseinde, Poelcappelle, Passchendaele, Hamel, Amiens, Albert 1918, Mont St Quentin, Hindenburg Line, Beaurevoir, France and Flanders 1916–18.
- World War II: South-West Pacific 1943–45, Lae–Nadzab, Finisterres, Egan's Ridge–Hongorai Ford, Ogorata River, Bobdubi I, Bobdubi II, Liberation of Australian New Guinea, Hongorai River, Hari River, Mivo Ford.

== Notes ==
Footnotes

Citations
