= Heathcote Hammer =

Australian general

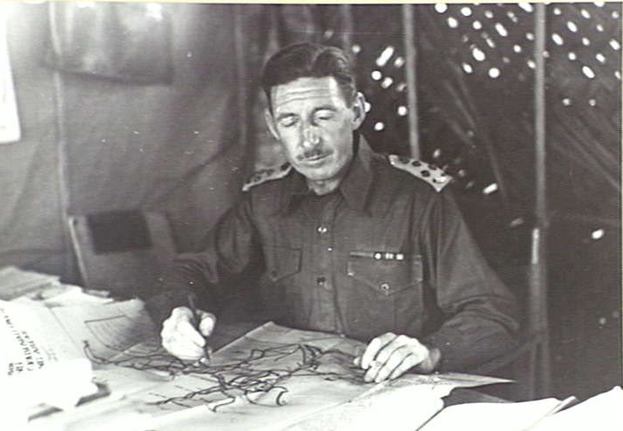
- Brigadier Heathcote Hammer at Siar, New Guinea in June 1944
- Born: 15 February 1905; Southern Cross, Western Australia
- Died: 10 March 1961 (aged 56); Brighton, Victoria
- Burial place: Springvale Botanical Cemetery
- Military career
- Allegiance: Australia
- Branch: Australian Army
- Service years: 1923–1959
- Rank: Major General
- Nicknames: "Tack", "Sledge"
- Commands: 3rd Division (1956–59); 2nd Armoured Brigade (1953–56); 15th Brigade (1943–45); 2/48th Infantry Battalion (1942–43)
- Conflicts: Second World War; Battle of Greece; North African Campaign; First Battle of El Alamein; Second Battle of El Alamein; South West Pacific theatre; New Guinea Campaign; Bougainville Campaign
- Awards: Commander of the Order of the British Empire; Distinguished Service Order & Bar; Efficiency Decoration; Mentioned in Despatches

Major General Heathcote Howard Hammer, CBE, DSO & Bar, ED (15 February 1905 – 10 March 1961) was a senior officer in the Australian Army, seeing service during the Second World War. After working as a traveling salesman he joined the Militia, Australia's part-time military force, in 1923, starting out as an enlisted soldier before being commissioned as an officer. By 1939, having served with several infantry units, he had reached the rank of major. Following the outbreak of the Second World War, Hammer volunteered for overseas service and fought in Greece, North Africa, New Guinea and Bougainville. He remained in the military after the war, rising to command at divisional level before retiring in 1959. He died in 1961 at the age of 56.

== Early years and personal life ==
Hammer was born on 15 February 1905 in Southern Cross, Western Australia. His father, William, was a miner, and after his parents moved to Victoria, he lived in Bendigo, where he attended the School of Mines. Following his education he was employed as a travelling salesman. On 26 October 1935, he married Mary Frances Morrissey at St Patrick's Catholic Cathedral, Melbourne. The couple had two children – a son and daughter – but were divorced in 1955. Hammer later remarried, taking Helena Irena Olova, née Vymazal, an Austrian, as his second wife.

== Military career ==
Hammer enlisted in the Militia in 1923, serving initially in the ranks. In 1926, he was commissioned as a lieutenant in the 8th Infantry Battalion. By 1939, he had achieved the rank of major, having also served in the 17th Light Horse (Machine Gun) Regiment. Following the outbreak of the war, he joined the Second Australian Imperial Force on 8 June 1940, volunteering for overseas service. After a series of regimental postings, including brigade major of 16th Brigade, which was part of the 6th Division, Hammer was sent to the Middle East in 1941. After serving in Greece, the following year he was promoted to lieutenant colonel and placed in command of the 2/48th Battalion, the most decorated Australian infantry battalion of the war.

Hammer led the unit in the fighting at the Second Battle of El Alamein from July 1942, planning and executing the capture of Trig 29 on 26 July. In the last attack launched by the division on 30/31 October the 2/48th Infantry Battalion was ordered to take a position known as the Cloverleaf. During the attack, Hammer sustained a gunshot wound to his right cheek. The German bullet pieced his cheek and exited through to the other side, but did not touch any bones or teeth. At the same time he took two German prisoners. With only 41 of his men remaining, he withdrew and by dawn they had dug in. He continued to command the 2/48th Infantry Battalion until it was withdrawn from the Middle East and brought back to Australia in early 1943. In January 1943, he was invested with the Distinguished Service Order (DSO) for his actions in the Middle East.

In June 1943, Hammer was promoted to brigadier and given command of the 15th Brigade. He led the brigade until the end of the war, commanding it through the fighting in New Guinea and Bougainville. For his service in New Guinea he received a Bar to his DSO in 1944, and in 1945 was made a Commander of the Order of the British Empire.

After the war, Hammer became Commissioner for Repatriation in Victoria and continued his military career in the Citizens Military Force. In 1947 he received a belated Mention in Despatches. He was placed in command of the 2nd Armoured Brigade in 1953. In 1956, he was promoted to major general and took command of the 3rd Division.

== Later life ==
Hammer retired in 1959 and died on 10 March 1961 in Brighton; he was buried in Springvale Botanical Cemetery.

== Notes ==
Military offices
Preceded by Major General Robert Risson	General Officer Commanding 3rd Division; 1956–1959	Succeeded by Major General Noel Simpson
