= Tsili Tsili Airfield =

Tsili Tsili Airfield
- Part of Fifth Air Force
- Located in Morobe Province, Papua New Guinea

Site information
- Type: Military airfield
- Controlled by: United States Army Air Forces

Location
- Coordinates: 06°50′55.34″S 146°20′59.67″E

Site history
- Built: 1943
- In use: 1943–1944

Tsili Tsili (Tsile-Tsile) Airfield is a former World War II airfield in Morobe Province, Papua New Guinea. The airfield was constructed in secret, behind Japanese lines and played an important role in the allies establishing aerial supremacy over New Guinea. The airfield was abandoned after the war and today has almost totally returned to its natural state.

== History ==
The area was occupied by Allied forces in the middle of June 1943. The field was hastily constructed by the United States Army 871st Airborne Engineers under the protection of the 57th/60th Australian Infantry Battalion which formed the garrison force. The logistical, engineering and manpower challenges were significant. All personnel, supplies, food, fuel and equipment had to be flown into the base via C-47s from Port Moresby, including heavy engineering machinery. Each piece of engineering equipment (for example bulldozers) was first dismantled and loaded onto several planes, and was then reassembled at Tsili Tsili once all the pieces had arrived. Both the Americans and the Australians worked to build roads into the aerodrome from Nadzab, 3.5 miles (5.5 kilometres) away, and upgrade the landing strip to enable it to land these large transport planes.

The first fighters were based at the airfield from the 26 July. This forward base allowed fighters to escort longer-range bombers in attacks on targets as far away as Japan's major new airbases at Wewak, 302 miles (484 kilometres) away.

The Japanese command at Wewak discovered the Tsili-Tsili airfield and launched preemptive attacks on 15 and 16 August 1943, inflicting casualties, but doing little damage to the airfield. On 17 and 18 August, Allied forces launched a series of large attacks that first bombed and then strafed all four Japanese airfields at Wewak, heavily damaging many aircraft and facilities. As a result, Japan lost air superiority over New Guinea.

=== Major USAAF units assigned ===
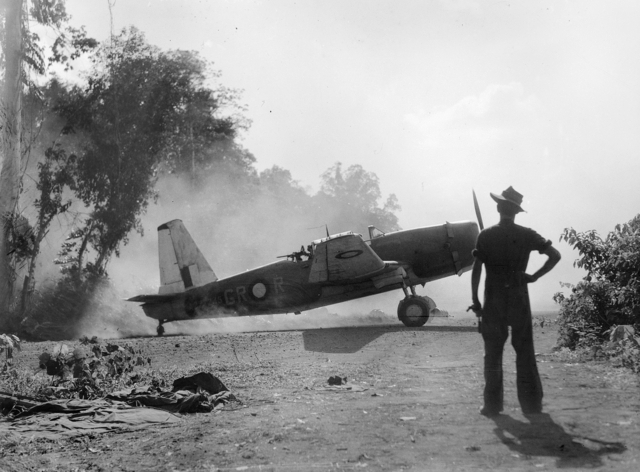
A Vultee Vengeance from No. 24 Squadron Royal Australian Air Force at Tsili Tsili Airfield in November 1943

- 35th Fighter Group (15 August – 5 October 1943)

Headquarters, 40th, P-39 Airacobra, 41st Fighter Squadrons, P-38 Lightning

- 8th Fighter Squadron, (49th Fighter Group), (30 August – 29 October 1943), P-40 Warhawk
- 65th Troop Carrier Squadron, (54th Troop Carrier Wing), (18 September – 31 October 1943), C-47 Skytrain
- 433d Troop Carrier Group, (???? - 2 June 1944)

65th and 66th Troop Carrier Squadrons, C-47 Skytrain

Other known units at Tsili Tsili were the USAAF 2nd Air Task Force, which was formed for operations around Lae (5 August 1943) and the RAAF 24 Squadron (Vultee Vengeance) in November 1943 and 4 Squadron (Boomerang) September 1943 - January 1944.

== See also ==
- USAAF in the Southwest Pacific
