= Frank Berryman =

Australian Army general (1894–1981)

Sir Frank Berryman
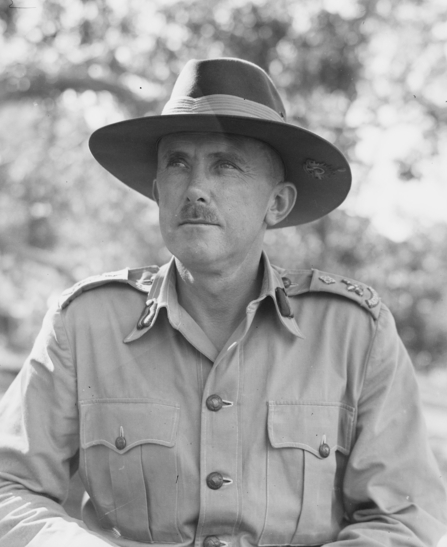
- Major General Frank Berryman in 1944
- Born: 11 April 1894; Geelong, Victoria
- Died: 28 May 1981 (aged 87); Rose Bay, New South Wales
- Military career
- Allegiance: Australia
- Branch: Australian Army
- Service years: 1913–1954
- Rank: Lieutenant General
- Nicknames: "Frank the Florist" "Berry the Bastard"
- Service number: VX20308
- Commands: Eastern Command (1946–51, 1952–53); I Corps (1944); II Corps (1943–44); Deputy Chief of the General Staff (1942–44); 14th Field Artillery Battery (1918); 18th Field Artillery Battery (1917–18)
- Conflicts: First World War; Battle of Pozières; Second Battle of Bullecourt; Battle of Passchendaele; Hundred Days Offensive; Second World War; Western Desert campaign; Syria-Lebanon campaign; Netherlands East Indies campaign; Battle of Buna-Gona; Salamaua–Lae campaign; Finisterre Range campaign; Huon Peninsula campaign; Philippines campaign (1944–45); Borneo campaign
- Awards: Knight Commander of the Royal Victorian Order; Companion of the Order of the Bath; Commander of the Order of the British Empire; Distinguished Service Order; Mention in Despatches (4); Medal of Freedom (US)
- Other work: Director General of the Royal Tour; Chief Executive Officer of the Royal Agricultural Society of New South Wales

Lieutenant General Sir Frank Horton Berryman, KCVO, CB, CBE, DSO (11 April 1894 – 28 May 1981) was an Australian Army officer who served as a general during the Second World War. The son of an engine driver, he entered Duntroon in 1913. His class graduated early after the First World War broke out, and he served on the Western Front with the field artillery. After the war, he spent nearly twenty years as a major.

Berryman joined the Second Australian Imperial Force (AIF) on 4 April 1940 with the rank of full colonel, and became General Staff Officer Grade 1 (GSO1) of the 6th Division. He was responsible for the staff work for the attacks on Bardia and Tobruk. In January 1941, Berryman became Commander, Royal Artillery, 7th Division, and was promoted to brigadier. During the Syria-Lebanon campaign, he commanded "Berryforce". He returned to Australia in 1942, becoming Major General, General Staff, of the First Army. Later that year, he became Deputy Chief of the General Staff under the Commander in Chief, General Sir Thomas Blamey, who brought him up to Port Moresby to simultaneously act as chief of staff of New Guinea Force. Berryman was intimately involved with the planning and execution of the Salamaua–Lae campaign and the Huon Peninsula campaign. In November 1943 he became acting commander of II Corps, which he led in the Battle of Sio. In the final part of the war, he was Blamey's representative at General of the Army Douglas MacArthur's headquarters and the Australian Army representative at the Japanese surrender in Tokyo Bay.

After the war, Berryman commanded Eastern Command. He directed the military response to the 1949 Australian coal strike. Berryman hoped to become Chief of the General Staff but was passed over as he was seen as a "Blamey man" by Prime Minister Ben Chifley. He retired and became the Director General of the Royal Tour of Queen Elizabeth II in 1954. He was chief executive officer of the Royal Agricultural Society of New South Wales from 1954 to 1961.

== Education and early life ==
Frank Horton Berryman was born in Geelong, Victoria, on 11 April 1894, the fourth of six children and the eldest of three sons of William Lee Berryman, a Victorian Railways engine driver, and his wife, Annie Jane, née Horton. William Berryman joined in the 1903 Victorian Railways strike and, when it failed, was reinstated with a 14 per cent pay cut, only regaining his 1903 pay level in 1916. Frank was educated at Melbourne High School, where he served in the school Cadet Unit, and won the Rix prize for academic excellence. On graduation, he took a job with the Victorian railways as a junior draughtsman.

In 1913, Berryman entered the Royal Military College, Duntroon, having ranked first among the 154 candidates on the entrance examination. Of the 33 members in his class, nine died in the First World War, and six later became generals: Leslie Beavis, Berryman, William Bridgeford, John Chapman, Edward Milford and Alan Vasey. Berryman rose to fifth in order of merit before his class graduated early, in June 1915, because of the outbreak of the First World War.

== First World War ==
Berryman's Duntroon class had not yet completed its military training. Major General William Throsby Bridges decided that regimental duty would rectify that deficiency, so he assigned the Duntroon cadets as regimental officers of the First Australian Imperial Force (AIF), rather than as staff officers. Cadets were given the choice of service in the infantry or light horse. One cadet, Lawrence Wackett, protested that he wished to serve in the technical services. When asked if they would prefer the technical services, twelve cadets, including Berryman, Beavis, Clowes, Vasey, and Wackett stepped forward. Berryman was commissioned as a lieutenant in the Permanent Military Forces (PMF) on 29 June 1915 and again in the First AIF on 1 July 1915. He was posted to Lieutenant Colonel Harold Grimwade's 4th Field Artillery Brigade of the 2nd Division Artillery, along with Vasey and Milford. Berryman embarked for Egypt with the 4th Field Artillery Brigade on the transport Wiltshire on 17 November 1915. In Egypt, Berryman briefly commanded the 4th Brigade Ammunition Column before it was absorbed into the 2nd Division Ammunition Column.

The 2nd Division moved to France in March 1916. Berryman became a temporary captain on 1 April 1916, a rank which became substantive on 10 June 1916. In January 1917, he was posted to the 7th Infantry Brigade as a trainee staff captain. During the Second Battle of Bullecourt he served with 2nd Division headquarters. He was appointed to command the 18th Field Artillery Battery, and became a temporary major on 1 September 1917, which became substantive on 10 September 1917. This was as far as he could go, for Duntroon graduates could not be promoted above major in the AIF. This policy was aimed at giving them a broad range of experience, which would benefit the Army, while not allowing them to outnumber the available post-war positions.

While commanding the 18th Field Battery, Berryman saw action at the Battle of Passchendaele. For his service as a battery commander in this battle, he received a Mention in Despatches:

This officer has commanded the Battery during the whole of the period under review and did particularly good and effective work during the operations in September, October and November in the Hooge area [in Belgium]. He showed great initiative in reconnoitring Battery positions often under heavy fire; in keeping touch with the Infantry Companies in the front line area and in observing and reporting on hostile movements rendering many useful reports. In particular he did a very fine piece of work on 14th September in moving his Battery forward behind Clapham Junction in the dusk under very heavy shelling over a very difficult road. He subsequently during the very heavy German counter attacks on 16th September succeeded in registering his Battery and using it in the operation notwithstanding the heavy hostile fire. The Battery suffered many casualties both in personnel and materiel but it fought with splendid determination and the men who had never previously been under the command of this officer in action throughout the operations before Hooge were kept in the most excellent fighting spirit by his determination, lead and strong personality. He has shewn himself to be an officer of remarkable judgement and great technical ability.

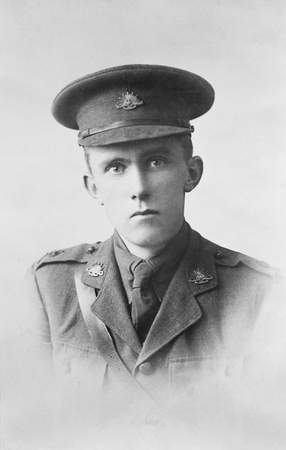
Major Frank Berryman in 1918

In September 1918, he was awarded the Distinguished Service Order. His citation, signed by Major General Charles Rosenthal, read:

This officer has commanded the 14th Battery from 8th May 1918 to the present date [September 1918]. During the recent operations on the Somme he has shown conspicuous activity and ability and as Group liaison with Infantry Brigades has earned great praise from Infantry Brigade commanders for his conscientious and untiring work. The work and appearance of his Battery both when in and out of the line, has been excellent, and his sound judgement and technical ability have been of the greatest assistance to his Brigade.

Berryman was later nominated for a bar to his Distinguished Service Order for the September 1918 fighting, but this was subsequently downgraded to a second Mention in Despatches. He was wounded in the right eye in September 1918 while he was commanding the 14th Field Artillery Battery. Although his wound was serious enough to warrant hospitalisation, there was no permanent damage to his vision. It was however the end of his career as a battery commander, as the Army took the opportunity to transfer him to a staff post. From 28 October 1918 to 1 July 1919, he was brigade major of the 7th Infantry Brigade. With the war over, he returned to Australia in October 1919.

== Between the wars ==
Berryman was appointed to the Staff Corps on 1 October 1920. Although he was entitled to keep his AIF rank of major as an honorary rank, his substantive rank—and pay grade—was still lieutenant. Promotion was painfully slow. He was promoted to captain and brevet major on 1 March 1923, but was not promoted to the substantive rank of major until 1 March 1935.

Berryman attended the Royal Military Academy, Woolwich, from 1920 to 1923. On returning to Australia, he became an inspecting ordnance officer at the 2nd Military District. From its headquarters at Victoria Barracks, Sydney, the 2nd Military District administered the Army in most of New South Wales. He enrolled in a Bachelor of Science program at the University of Sydney. On 30 November 1925, he married Muriel Whipp. They eventually had a daughter and a son.

Berryman discontinued his university studies to prepare for the entrance examination for Staff College, Camberley. Eighteen Australian Army officers sat the exam that year, but only Berryman and one other officer passed. Only two Australian officers were accepted into staff college each year, so Berryman's attendance from 1926 to 1928 marked him out as one of the Australian Army's rising talents. It also allowed him to forge useful contacts with the British Army. Berryman later recalled, "The advantage of this was that in war we had the same doctrine of tactics and administration, which was essential if we had to work together. More than that, the officers who had to carry out their duties in cooperation knew each other personally." After graduation he was posted to the High Commission of Australia, London, from 1929 to 1932, where he served under the Military Liaison Officer, Major General Julius Bruche.

After nearly twenty years as a major, Berryman was promoted to brevet lieutenant colonel on 12 May 1935. Promotion to substantive rank, which carried the rank's pay as well as status, occurred on 1 July 1938, when he became assistant director of Military Operations at Army Headquarters. From December 1938 to April 1940 he was General Staff Officer Grade 1 (GSO1) of the 3rd Division. The slow rate of promotion of regular officers in the inter-war years fostered a sense of injustice and frustration among officers with good war records who found themselves outranked by Militia officers who had enjoyed faster promotion.

== Second World War ==
=== Libya ===
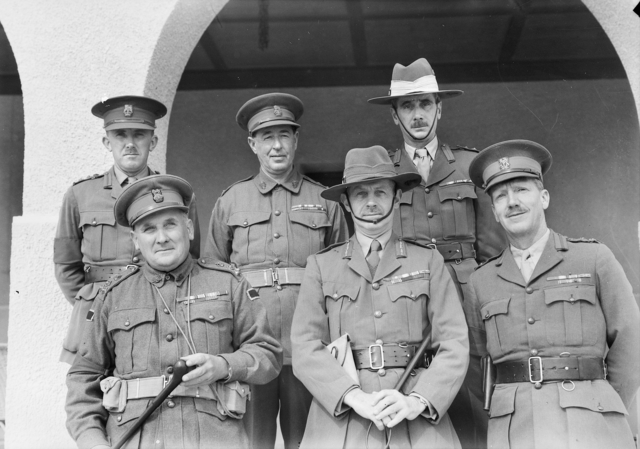
Senior officers of the 6th Division. Front row, left to right: Brigadier Arthur Allen, 16th Infantry Brigade; Major General Iven Mackay; Brigadier Horace Robertson, 19th Infantry Brigade. Back row, left to right: Colonel Frank Berryman, GSO1; Brigadier Stanley Savige, 17th Infantry Brigade; Colonel Alan Vasey, AA&QMG.

The final straw for many regular officers was Prime Minister Robert Menzies' announcement that all commands in the Second AIF would go to Militia officers, which Berryman considered "a damn insult to the professional soldier, calculated to split the Army down the centre. We were to be the hewers of wood and the drawers of water. We, the only people who really knew the job, were to assist these Militia fellows."

Berryman joined the Second AIF on 4 April 1940 with the rank of full colonel, receiving the AIF serial number of VX20308, and became General Staff Officer Grade 1 (GSO1) of Major General Iven Mackay's 6th Division, in succession to Sydney Rowell who stepped up to become chief of staff of I Corps. Berryman soon established a good working relationship with Mackay. Despite the friction between Militia and Staff Corps officers, Berryman chose to assess officers on performance. This meant that while Berryman viewed some Militia officers, like Brigadier Stanley Savige of the 17th Infantry Brigade, with disdain, he maintained good relations with others. There were also personal and professional rivalries with other Staff Corps officers, such as Alan Vasey. Yet even those who disliked Berryman personally for his lack of patience and tact and referred to him as "Berry the Bastard" respected his abilities as a staff officer.

Mackay and Berryman were determined that the Battle of Bardia would not be a repeat of the disastrous landing at Anzac Cove in 1915. Berryman's talent for operational staff work came to the fore. From studies of aerial photographs, he selected a spot for the attack where the terrain was most favourable. His plan provided for the coordination of infantry, armour and artillery. Though at times he proved secretive and hard to deal with, during the battle his forceful personality provided a good foil to the sometimes indecisive Mackay. Later that month Berryman planned the equally successful Battle of Tobruk. For his services in this campaign, he was made a Commander of the Order of the British Empire (CBE).

=== Syria ===
In January 1941, Berryman became Commander, Royal Artillery, in Arthur "Tubby" Allen's 7th Division, and was promoted to brigadier. During the Syria-Lebanon campaign, Berryman demonstrated that he was a thrusting commander who led from the front and repeatedly demonstrated his coolness under fire. When his headquarters came under shell fire for the first time, Berryman sat calmly eating his breakfast "among the flying brick dust and bursting shells", simply telling the men to shut the door, "so they can eat breakfast without being covered in dust".

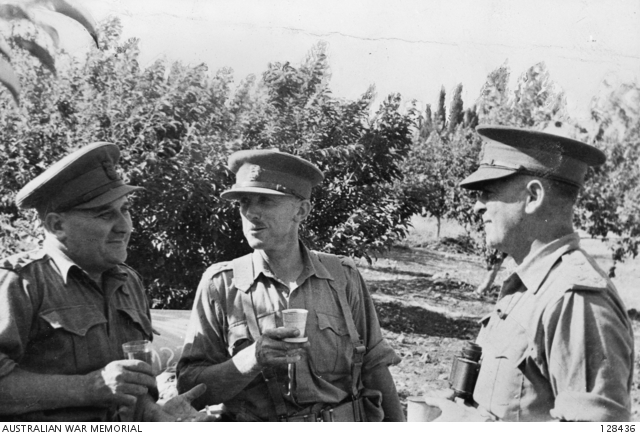
Syria, June 1941. Left to right: Major General A. S. Allen, Brigadier F. H. Berryman and Brigadier A. R. Baxter-Cox.

During the Vichy French counterattack, Berryman was given command of the Australian forces in the centre of the position around Merdjayoun. This scratch force became known as "Berryforce". His mission was to check the enemy advance in the Merdjayoun area. Berryman decided that the best way to do this would be to recapture Merdjayoun. This presented considerable difficulty, for although his force contained two infantry battalions, the 2/25th and 2/33rd, and a pioneer battalion, the 2/2nd, his headquarters was not equipped to control a battle in the manner of an infantry brigade, as it lacked appropriate staff and communications. Moreover, though he was supported by mechanised cavalry and 22 artillery pieces, the opposing French forces had tanks.

For the next two weeks, the outnumbered Berryforce attempted to retake the strategically important town in the Battle of Merdjayoun. His first attempt was a failure. After carrying out a personal reconnaissance on 18 June, Berryman tried again. This time his attack was halted by staunch defence by the French Foreign Legion and tanks. Berryman then tried a different approach. Instead of attempting to capture the town, he seized high ground overlooking the French supply lines. Faced with being cut off, the French withdrew from the town. Berryforce was then dissolved and Berryman returned to his role as commander of the 7th Division artillery.

The 7th Division was now concentrated in the coastal sector. Berryman clashed with Brigadier Jack Stevens of the 21st Infantry Brigade over the siting of Berryman's artillery observation posts, which were forward of the infantry's front lines. Berryman wanted Stevens' positions advanced so as to obtain effective observation of the enemy's lines for Berryman's gunners. Stevens refused, hampering Berryman's efforts to support him in the Battle of Damour. Despite this, Berryman implemented an effective artillery plan. In the final stage of the battle, Berryman, without authority, ordered Lieutenant Colonel Denzil MacArthur-Onslow of the 2/6th Cavalry Regiment to pursue the retreating French forces, but was overruled by Savige and Allen. For his part in the campaign, Berryman received a third Mention in Despatches.

=== Papua ===
On 3 August 1941, Berryman became Brigadier, General Staff (chief of staff) of I Corps under Lieutenant General John Lavarack, again in succession to Rowell, who became Deputy Chief of the General Staff (DCGS). Berryman arrived in Jakarta by air with the advanced party of the I Corps headquarters staff on 26 January 1942 to plan its defence. Berryman reconnoitred Java and prepared an appreciation of the situation. Berryman also attempted to find out as much as possible about Japanese tactics through interviewing Colonel Ian MacAlister Stewart. This information found its way into papers circulated throughout the Army in Australia. It soon became apparent that the situation was hopeless and any troops committed to the defence of Java would be lost.

Berryman returned to Australia, where he was promoted to major general on 6 April 1942, when he became Major General, General Staff (chief of staff) of Lavarack's First Army. On 14 September 1942, Berryman became DCGS under the Commander in Chief, General Sir Sir Thomas Blamey, in succession to Vasey. When New Guinea Force split into a rear headquarters under Blamey and an advanced headquarters under Lieutenant General Edmund Herring, so the latter could go forward to direct the Battle of Buna-Gona, Blamey brought Berryman up from Advanced LHQ in Brisbane to simultaneously act as chief of staff of New Guinea Force from 11 December 1942. Berryman formed a very close professional and personal relationship with Blamey, and henceforth Berryman would be Blamey's chief of staff and head of operational planning, which made him "one of the most important officers in the Australian Army in its struggle against the Japanese."

=== New Guinea ===
Blamey and Berryman remained close for the rest of the war, and Blamey came to rely heavily on Berryman for advice. It was Berryman who was sent to Wau to investigate the difficulties that Savige was having, and it was Berryman who exonerated Savige. "I reported the situation [to Blamey and Herring]," Berryman record in his diary, "and said Savige had done well and we had misjudged him." Berryman was intimately involved with the planning of the Salamaua–Lae campaign, working closely with Brigadier General Stephen J. Chamberlin at General Douglas MacArthur's General Headquarters (GHQ) in Brisbane. Berryman established good working relations with the Americans, even though their staff practices were quite different from those of the Australian Army.

Berryman understood the Americans and they understood him; he had a knack of avoiding friction without sacrificing Australian dignity or interests. His achievements in keeping the peace were of no mean order in light of America's preponderant contribution to the overall forces under MacArthur's command. It was a time when a careless word or a thoughtless gesture could have upset the delicate balance of the Australian-American partnership.

— John Herrington

Berryman was also involved in the plan's execution, once more becoming chief of staff at New Guinea Force under Blamey in August 1943. Berryman was frustrated at the failure of Vasey's 7th Division to destroy the Japanese retreating from Lae, and personally annoyed by the way that Vasey forwarded compliments to Major General Ennis Whitehead while leaving any complaints about air support to be taken up by Berryman. Berryman was next involved with the planning for the landing at Finschhafen, brokering a compromise landing plan between Rear Admiral Daniel E. Barbey and Lieutenant General Sir Edmund Herring. When Berryman discovered that the United States Seventh Fleet did not intend to reinforce the 9th Division he immediately went to Blamey, who took the matter up with MacArthur. In the event it was Berryman who brokered a compromise deal with Vice Admiral Arthur S. Carpender to reinforce Finschhafen with a battalion in APDs.

On 7 November 1943, Berryman became acting commander of II Corps, a post which became permanent on 20 January 1944, superseding Vasey, whose 7th Division was diplomatically placed directly under Lieutenant General Sir Leslie Morshead's New Guinea Force. II Corps was left with the 5th and 9th Divisions. Berryman was promoted to lieutenant general on 20 January 1944. As in Syria, Berryman proved a hard-driving commander. In December 1943, II Corps broke out of the position around Finschhafen and began a pursuit along the coast. Whenever the Japanese Army attempted to make a stand, Berryman attacked with 25-pounder artillery barrages and Matilda tanks. Berryman was aware that seasonal changes were making the surf rougher and making it ever harder to operate the US Army landing craft (LCMs) and Australian Army amphibious trucks (DUKWs) that he depended on for the logistical support of his troops, but he realised that the Japanese Army's supply difficulties were greater than his own, and he gambled that if he pushed hard enough the Japanese would be unable to regroup and organise a successful defence.

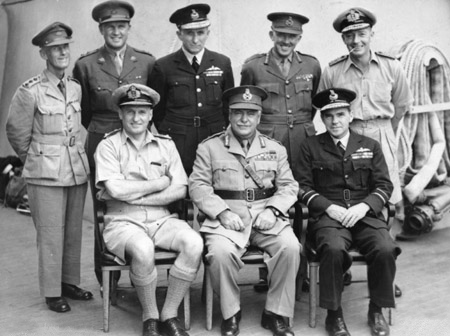
Berryman (back row, second from right) with General Sir Thomas Blamey (front row, centre) and the other Australian delegates to the Japanese surrender aboard USS Missouri, September 1945

In the first phase of the Battle of Sio, the advance from Finschhafen to Sio, 3,099 Japanese dead were counted and 38 prisoners taken, at a cost of 8 Australians killed and 48 wounded. In the 5th Division's subsequent drive from Sio to link up with the US 32nd Infantry Division at Saidor, 734 Japanese were killed and 1,775 found dead, while 48 prisoners were taken. Australian casualties were 4 killed and 6 wounded. MacArthur considered Berryman's performance "quite brilliant". For his part in the campaign, Berryman was made a Companion of the Order of the Bath (CB) on 8 March 1945.

=== Borneo ===
II Corps was renumbered I Corps on 13 April 1944 and returned to Australia, where Blamey gave Berryman his next assignment. In preparation for the Philippines Campaign, General MacArthur moved the advanced element of GHQ to Hollandia in Dutch West Papua, where it opened in late August 1944. To maintain contact with GHQ, Blamey formed a new headquarters, Forward Echelon LHQ, which opened at Hollandia on 7 September under Berryman, who became Blamey's personal representative at GHQ. Forward Echelon LHQ subsequently moved with GHQ to Leyte in February 1945, and Manila in April 1945. Berryman's role was to "safeguard Australian interests" at GHQ, but he also defended GHQ against criticism from the Australian Army. As well as liaising with GHQ, Forward Echelon LHQ became responsible for planning operations involving Australian troops. It worked on plans for operations on Luzon and Mindanao before it was finally decided that Borneo would be the Australian Army's next objective. In all of this Berrymen kept in close contact with Blamey, and the two were Australian Army representatives at the Japanese surrender in Tokyo Bay in September 1945. For his services in the final campaigns, Berryman received a fourth and final Mention in Despatches on 6 March 1947.

== Later life ==
After the war, Berryman took charge of Eastern Command, an appointment he held from March 1946 to February 1951 and again from March 1952 to December 1953. Berryman became known for his involvement in charitable organisations such as the War Widows Association, and as head of the Remembrance Drive Project. For this and his commitment to beautifying the Army barracks, Berryman became colloquially known in the Army as "Frank the Florist".

In June 1949, the country was rocked by the 1949 Australian coal strike. The strike began when stocks of coal were already low, especially in New South Wales, and rationing was introduced. Prime Minister Ben Chifley turned to the Army to get the troops to mine coal. This became possible when the transport unions agreed to transport coal that was mined. Responsibility for planning and organising the effort fell to Berryman. Soldiers began mining at Muswellbrook and Lithgow on 1 August, and by 15 August, when the strike ended, some 4,000 soldiers and airmen were employed. They continued work until production was fully restored.

Berryman hoped to become Chief of the General Staff in succession to Lieutenant General Vernon Sturdee but he was seen as a "Blamey man" by Chifley and his Labor government colleagues, who disliked the former Commander-in-Chief. The job was instead given to Rowell. The United States government awarded Berryman the Medal of Freedom with Silver Palm in 1948. Following the change of government in 1949, Berryman lobbied Sir Eric Harrison, the Liberal Minister for Defence Production, for the job on the retirement of Rowell in 1954, but he was now considered too old for the job. He instead retired from the army, at age 60, in April 1954.

Berryman became the Director General of the Royal Tour of Queen Elizabeth II in 1954, for which he was made a Knight Commander of the Royal Victorian Order (KCVO). He was chief executive officer of the Royal Agricultural Society of New South Wales from 1954 to 1961. He died on 28 May 1981 at Rose Bay, New South Wales, and was cremated with full military honours. At the time of his funeral the Ambassador for Lebanon, Raymond Heneine, wrote in the Canberra Times: "The inhabitants of Jezzine will never forget General Berryman, who liberated their town from the forces of the Vichy French in collaboration with the Italian and German forces. He was for them not only a great general but also a great benefactor who provided them with food supplies and medical care. In fact he was the example of humanitarianism".

== Notes ==
Military offices
| Preceded by Lieutenant General Victor Secombe | GOC Eastern Command; 1952–1953 | Succeeded by Lieutenant General Eric Woodward |
| Preceded by Major General Eric Plant | GOC Eastern Command; 1946–1951 | Succeeded by Lieutenant General William Bridgeford |
| Preceded by Lieutenant General Stanley Savige | GOC I Corps; 1944 | Succeeded by Lieutenant General Sir Leslie Morshead |
| Preceded by Lieutenant General Sir Leslie Morshead | GOC II Corps; 1943–1944 | Succeeded by Lieutenant General Stanley Savige |
