= George Alan Vasey =

Australian general (1895–1945)

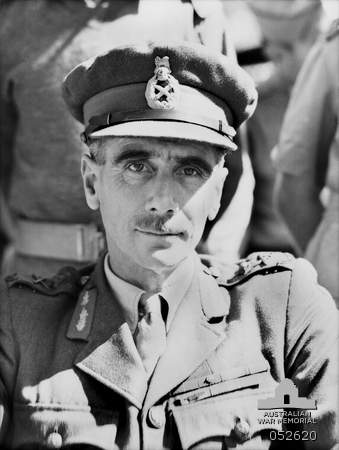
- Vasey in 1943
- Born: 29 March 1895; Malvern East, Victoria
- Died: 5 March 1945 (aged 49) near Cairns, Queensland
- Burial place: Cairns, Queensland
- Spouse: Jessie Mary Halbert (m. 1921)
- Military career
- Allegiance: Australia
- Branch: Australian Army
- Service years: 1913–1945
- Rank: Major General
- Nickname: "Bloody George"
- Service number: VX9
- Commands: 7th Division (1942–1944); 6th Division (1942); Deputy Chief of the General Staff (1942); 19th Infantry Brigade (1941); 13th Field Battery (1916–1917)
- Conflicts: First World War; Battle of Pozières; Battle of Messines; Battle of Passchendaele; German spring offensive; Hundred Days Offensive; Second World War; Battle of Greece; Battle of Crete; New Guinea campaign; Kokoda Track campaign; Salamaua-Lae campaign; Finisterre Range campaign
- Awards: Companion of the Order of the Bath; Commander of the Order of the British Empire; Distinguished Service Order & Bar; Mentioned in Despatches (4); Distinguished Service Cross (United States); War Cross (Greece)

Major General George Alan Vasey, CB, CBE, DSO & Bar (29 March 1895 – 5 March 1945) was an Australian Army officer. He rose to the rank of major general during the Second World War, before being killed in a plane crash near Cairns in 1945.

A professional soldier, Vasey graduated from Royal Military College, Duntroon in 1915 and served on the Western Front with the Australian Imperial Force, for which he was awarded the Distinguished Service Order and twice Mentioned in Despatches. For nearly twenty years, Vasey remained in the rank of major, serving on staff posts in Australia and with the Indian Army.

Shortly after the outbreak of Second World War in September 1939, Lieutenant General Sir Thomas Blamey appointed Vasey to the staff of the 6th Division. In March 1941, Vasey took command of 19th Infantry Brigade, which he led in the Battle of Greece and Battle of Crete. Returning to Australia in 1942, Vasey was promoted to major general and became Deputy Chief of the General Staff. In September 1942, he assumed command of the 7th Division, fighting the Japanese in the Kokoda Track campaign and the Battle of Buna-Gona. In 1943, he embarked on his second campaign in New Guinea, leading the 7th Division in the Landing at Nadzab and the subsequent Finisterre Range campaign.

By mid-1944, his health had deteriorated to the extent that he was evacuated to Australia, and for a time was not expected to live. By early 1945 he had recovered sufficiently to be appointed to command the 6th Division. While flying to assume this new command, the RAAF Lockheed Hudson aircraft he was travelling in crashed into the sea, killing all on board.

== Early life ==
George Alan Vasey was born in Malvern East, Victoria on 29 March 1895, the third of six children of George Brinsden Vasey, a barrister and solicitor, and his wife Alice Isabel, née McCutcheon. Because his father was also George Vasey, George Alan Vasey's family always called him Alan. He was educated at Camberwell Grammar School and Wesley College, Melbourne, where his schoolmates included Robert Menzies and Edward James Milford. At Wesley, Vasey served in the Australian Army Cadets, in which he became a second lieutenant.

In 1913, he entered the Royal Military College, Duntroon in Canberra. Of 33 members of his class, in which Vasey graduated tenth, nine died in the Great War. Six later became generals: Leslie Beavis, Frank Horton Berryman, William Bridgeford, John Chapman, Edward James Milford and Vasey himself. The war, which began in August 1914, caused his class to be graduated early, in June 1915.

== First World War ==
Vasey was commissioned as a lieutenant in the Permanent Military Forces (regular army), and joined the Australian Imperial Force (AIF). He was posted to the 2nd Division Artillery, and sailed for Egypt in December 1915. The 2nd Division moved to France in March 1916, where Vasey was promoted to captain in August, and given command of the 13th Field Battery in November.

In February 1917 Vasey was posted to Brigadier General James Cannan's 11th Infantry Brigade as a trainee staff captain. Vasey became brigade major of the 11th Infantry Brigade in August 1917, General Cannan having formed a high opinion of him. The brigade, part of Major General John Monash's 3rd Division, was involved in heavy fighting at Messines and Passchendaele, for which Vasey was promoted to major in September 1917 and awarded the Distinguished Service Order. His recommendation read:

During the periods October 4th and 12th 1917, as brigade major this officer worked continuously day and night with untiring effort and devotion to duty.

It was due to the assistance rendered by this officer that the arduous work was successfully carried out.

In July and August 1917 near Warneton this officer showed conspicuous gallantry in action in supervising the work of the battalions in the forward line without any fear for his personal safety in a way that was most eminently satisfactory and deserving of the highest praise.

During the 19 days in June 1917, that this brigade was in the line in front of Messines, Major Vasey carried out the duties of brigade major with devotion and ability.

This officer has been brigade major of this brigade since August 1917 and during the whole of this period he has worked with zeal and ability in such a way that his work has been most successful, and has aided materially in bringing the brigade to its present high standard of efficiency.

In July 1918 Vasey was assigned to 3rd Division Headquarters as a staff officer (GSO3) but this appointment was brief; his successor at the 11th Infantry Brigade was wounded and Vasey returned to his former post. As such, he participated in the defence of Amiens, the Battle of Amiens in August 1918 and the attack on the Hindenburg Line in September. He was also twice Mentioned in Despatches. He served for a time as GSO2 of the 3rd Division before embarking for Australia on 14 September 1919.

== Between the wars ==
Vasey returned to the PMF, in which he held the substantive rank of lieutenant and the honorary rank of major. He became so discouraged at his prospects with the Army that, studying at night, he qualified as an accountant. He married Jessie Mary Halbert at St Matthew's Church of England, Glenroy, Victoria on 17 May 1921. They bought a house in Kew, Victoria with a War Service Loan.

Vasey held a series of staff postings in Australia and India. From 1928 to 1929 he attended the Staff College at Quetta, India, where Bernard Montgomery was an instructor. In October 1934 he was appointed as a brigade major once more. Following a brief stint as a GSO2 on the headquarters of the 1st Indian Division, his final posting in India was again as a brigade major, from April 1936 to March 1937. By November 1934 his substantive rank was that of captain, but while he held the brevet and local rank of major, he was not promoted to the substantive rank of major until 1 March 1935. Vasey was finally promoted to brevet lieutenant colonel on 12 May 1937, after nearly 20 years as a major, although he was only promoted to the substantive rank on 2 November 1939. This was not unusual, and it fostered a sense of injustice and frustration among regular officers, who found themselves outranked by CMF officers who had enjoyed faster promotion.

== Second World War ==
=== Middle East and Greece ===
Shortly after the outbreak of the Second World War in September 1939, Lieutenant General Sir Thomas Blamey appointed Vasey to the 6th Division as his Assistant Adjutant General and Quartermaster General (AA&QMG), the senior logistics staff officer of the division. He received the Second AIF serial number VX9. Vasey embarked for Palestine as commander of the advance party of the division in December 1939.

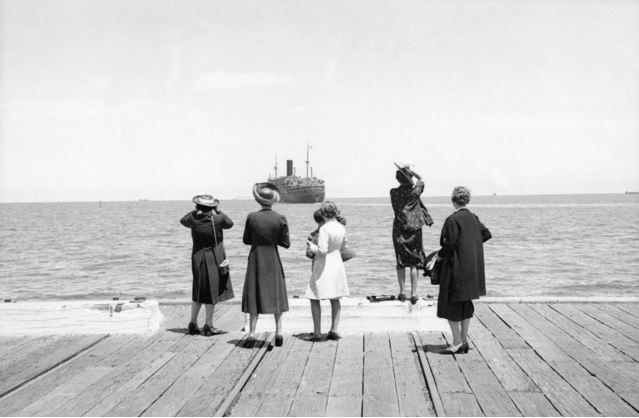
Women friends and family on the wharf waving farewell to the departing troop transport ship RMS Strathallan carrying the Advance Party of the 6th Division AIF to service overseas. They include: Vasey's wife Jessie (second from the left), her sisters Thelma Halbert (left) and Doris Sleigh (second from right), and Vasey's sister Marjorie (right).

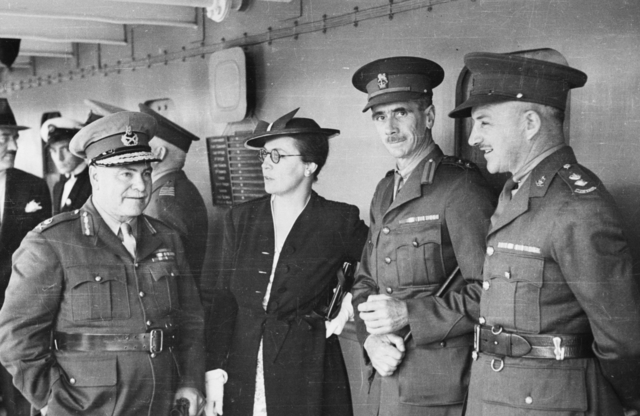
Lieutenant General Sir Thomas Blamey (left) talking with Jessie Vasey and lieutenant colonels George Vasey and John Chapman (right) on board the troop transport Strathallan in December 1939.

Gavin Long noted that Vasey was "highly strung, thrustful, hard working... concealed a deeply emotional even sentimental nature behind a mask of laconic and blunt speech. Although he was appointed to head the administrative staff there burned within him a desire to lead Australian troops as a commander." Nonetheless, Vasey remained AA&QMG during the Battle of Bardia. Following the capture of Tobruk in January 1941, he replaced Frank Berryman as GSO1.

In March 1941, Vasey was promoted to temporary brigadier and took command of the 6th Division's 19th Infantry Brigade following the departure of Horace Robertson to Australia on medical grounds. He led it in Greece, suffering a defeat at the Battle of Vevi. Vasey's instructions to his men were couched in typical Vasey terms: "Here you bloody well are and here you bloody well stay. And if any bloody German gets between your post and the next, turn your bloody bren around and shoot him up the arse." The 19th Infantry Brigade was evacuated to Crete, where it fought in the Battle of Crete. Vasey was commended for his work in Crete and was among the last to be evacuated to Egypt, but some 3,000 Australians were taken prisoner. Although it was a bitter defeat, Vasey's performance was considered outstanding; he was appointed a Commander of the Order of the British Empire (CBE), awarded a Bar to his DSO, and later the Greek War Cross.

=== Papuan Campaign ===
Vasey returned to Australia in December 1941 to become Chief of Staff of Home Forces, with the rank of major general, which became substantive on 1 September 1942. At age 46, this made him the youngest general in the Australian Army for a time. His new command had the role of training and organising the Army in Australia, a task which became urgent with the entry of Japan into the war. In March 1942, Vasey, along with Major General Edmund Herring and Brigadier Clive Steele, approached Army Minister Frank Forde with a proposal that all officers over the age of 50 be immediately retired and Major General Horace Robertson appointed Commander in Chief. The "revolt of the generals" collapsed with the welcome news that Blamey was returning from the Middle East to become Commander in Chief. In the reorganisation that followed his return, Blamey appointed Vasey as Deputy Chief of the General Staff (DCGS). The two men worked closely, with Vasey conveying Blamey's orders to commanders in the field. With the establishment of Advanced Land Headquarters (Landops) at St Lucia, Queensland, Vasey became the principal operational staff officer there.

In September 1942, Blamey decided to send the 6th Division to Papua to help stem the Japanese advance along the Kokoda Trail. He visited Lieutenant General Sydney Rowell, commander of New Guinea Force and I Corps, in Port Moresby and asked him who he would prefer to command the division. Rowell selected Vasey, so Vasey became commander of the 6th Division, and was replaced as DCGS by Berryman. Later that month, General Douglas MacArthur and Prime Minister John Curtin ordered Blamey to take personal command of New Guinea Force. After a falling out, Blamey relieved first Rowell, replacing him with Herring, and then Major General Arthur "Tubby" Allen of the 7th Division. On 27 October, Vasey flew up to Myola to relieve Allen.

Under Vasey's command, the 7th Division recaptured Kokoda on 2 November. It pushed on towards the north coast of Papua, only to be stopped by the Japanese short of their ultimate objective. The division was forced to fight a bloody battle around Buna, and, together with American troops under Lieutenant General Robert L. Eichelberger, ultimately defeated the Japanese and captured Gona. After the campaign, the 7th Division returned to Australia. The men went on leave before reassembling for training on the Atherton Tableland. Vasey went on leave in Melbourne but wound up being admitted to the Heidelberg Military Hospital for treatment for Malaria.

=== New Guinea Campaign ===
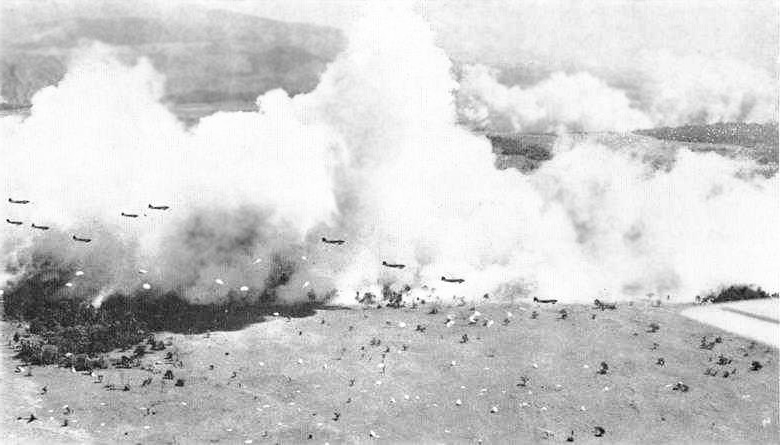
Nadzab, New Guinea, 5 September 1943. Paratroops of the US 503rd Parachute Infantry seize the airstrip at Nadzab, allowing the 7th Division to fly in. General Vasey was in the plane from which the photograph was taken.

By July 1943, the 7th Division was on its way back to Port Moresby. Vasey flew up to work out arrangements with Herring and the air commander in New Guinea, Major General Ennis Whitehead of the US Fifth Air Force. Probably inspired by his experience on Crete, Vasey proposed using paratroops, and pressed his superiors for an entire regiment instead of the battalion he was originally allotted. The new campaign opened in spectacular fashion on 5 September 1943 with a parachute drop of the US 503rd Parachute Infantry Regiment in broad daylight to seize the airstrip at Nadzab in the Markham Valley. They were soon reinforced by Australian and Papuan troops that had advanced overland from Wau, and then by the 7th Division's 25th Infantry Brigade, which flew in by air.

The 25th Infantry Brigade advanced down the Markham Valley and entered Lae on 16 September. The division then advanced up the Markham Valley and down the Ramu Valley. A series of operations followed. First, commandos of the 2/6th Independent Company seized Kaiapit in the Battle of Kaiapit on 19 September. Vasey flew there on 21 September in a Piper Cub, followed by his 21st Infantry Brigade, under Brigadier Ivan Dougherty. The 21st Infantry Brigade advanced on Gusap and then Dumpu, where Vasey established his headquarters on 10 October. Finally, it pushed on into the Finisterre Range, where it was halted by logistical difficulties. In the Finisterre Range campaign, the 7th Division captured Shaggy Ridge and advanced across the mountains towards Madang.

== Death and legacy ==
Despite his achievements, Vasey was twice passed over for promotion. In November 1943, the announcement of the appointment of Lieutenant General Iven Mackay as High Commissioner to India, and the subsequent elevation of Lieutenant General Leslie Morshead to command New Guinea Force and Second Army, created a vacancy at II Corps, which was filled by Vasey's old rival, Frank Berryman. Then in February 1944, the appointment of Lieutenant General Sir Edmund Herring as Chief Justice of the Supreme Court of Victoria, led to a vacancy at I Corps, for which General Blamey nominated both Vasey and Major General Stanley Savige, but recommended the latter. Army Minister Frank Forde queried Blamey's recommendation, which was very unusual, and asked who was the senior officer. On being informed that Savige was senior to Vasey—although not as senior as Arthur "Tubby" Allen or James Cannan—he dropped his objection. General Douglas MacArthur considered Vasey's supersession "outrageous". Yet Blamey had not lost faith in Vasey; asked at a social function about his opinion of Vasey, Blamey called out to him across the room. "There, ladies and gentlemen," Blamey declared, "is my ideal fighting commander."

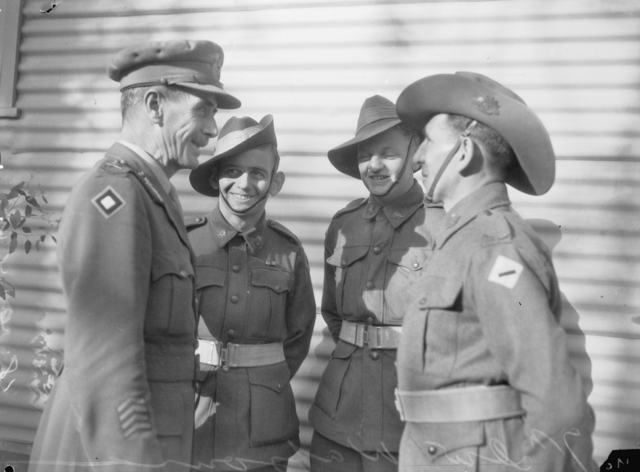
Vasey chats with three of his men. Vasey's concern for and rapport with his men was a key factor in his success as a general.

Blamey had reason to be concerned about Vasey's health. Vasey was drinking heavily, and was hospitalised in New Guinea in February 1944 with a skin condition, and again in Australia in March 1944 with a respiratory tract infection. In June 1944, he became seriously ill with malaria and acute Peripheral neuropathy, and for a time was not expected to live. 7th Division soldiers in the hospital constantly asked the nursing staff about his progress. The men called him 'Bloody George', not after his casualties, but after his favourite adjective, and Vasey's personable style of command attracted immense loyalty from his men. "Vasey owns the 7th," wrote a Melbourne journalist, "but every man in the division believes he owns Vasey." He was again Mentioned in Despatches on 21 July 1944.

Vasey slowly recovered. In October 1944, Blamey set up a Post-War Army Planning Committee headed by Vasey to report on the future of the Royal Military College and the training and education of Staff Corps officers. Vasey called for a greatly expanded regular army of 20,000 men. His report recommended that the course at Duntroon be deepened professionally and academically to the level of an undergraduate university degree. The report's recommendations were not accepted or welcomed by the government but pointed the way to the future, in which the Army would become increasingly professional. In February 1945, Frank Forde pressed for Vasey to be given another active command. Blamey, who still had doubts about Vasey's physical fitness despite Vasey being given an A by an Army medical board, reluctantly appointed him to command the 6th Division, then in action in the Aitape-Wewak campaign.

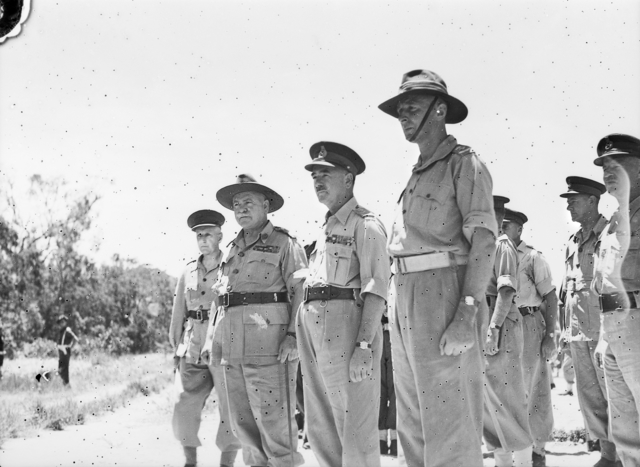
Generals Simpson, Blamey, and Morshead pay their respects at the military funeral service for Generals Vasey and Downes in Cairns. A public memorial service was also held in Melbourne.

Vasey flew north to take up his new command. The aircraft Vasey was travelling in, RAAF Lockheed Hudson A16-118, took off from RAAF Station Archerfield on the afternoon of 5 March 1945. Due to a cyclone that was ravaging the Queensland coast at the time, the aircraft crashed into the sea about 400 metres (440 yd) out from Machans Beach, just north of the mouth of the Barron River, 2 kilometres (1.2 mi) short of the Cairns Airport. Vasey was killed in the crash along with all those on board. He became the fourth most senior Australian officer to die in the Second World War, after General Sir Cyril Brudenell White (who died in another Hudson crash in 1940), Lieutenant General Henry Wynter, and Major General Rupert Downes (who died in the same plane crash as Vasey). Vasey's body was recovered from the crash site and was buried with full military honours in Cairns cemetery along with those of Downes and Lieutenant Colonel G. A. Bertram. Generals Blamey and Morshead were chief mourners. For pall bearers, Vasey had Major Generals Edward Milford and George Wootten and Brigadiers Frederick Chilton, Ivan Dougherty, Kenneth Eather, John O'Brien, Henry Wells and David Whitehead.

Vasey's concern for his men outlived him. Jessie went on to found the War Widow's Guild, serving as its president until her death in 1966. Thus, "the legacy of George Vasey's war was a more compassionate Australian society." As a military commander, Vasey demonstrated that a regular officer could be an "ideal fighting commander" and not just a competent staff officer. Vasey hastened the post-war transition of the Australian Army to a professional force dominated by regular soldiers. Historian David Horner wrote: "Not only was his command marked by tactical flair, innovation and imagination, but he also displayed remarkable qualities of leadership in adverse situations. Vasey led not just through technical expertise but by example, personality, and a genuine concern for his men."

Today, Vasey's papers are in the National Library of Australia, and his decorations are held by the Australian War Memorial, as is his portrait. A final Mention in Despatches was published three days after his death. The Mulgrave Shire Council (Cairns) named the esplanade at Trinity Beach "Vasey Esplanade" in his honour and erected a plaque on a brick memorial wall to commemorate all eleven service personnel lost in the crash.

== Notes ==
Military offices
Preceded by Major General Arthur Allen	General Officer Commanding 7th Division; 1942–1944	Succeeded by Major General Edward Milford
Preceded by Major General Allan Boase	General Officer Commanding 6th Division; 1942	Succeeded by Major General Jack Stevens
