= Horace Robertson =

Australian Army senior commander

Sir Horace Clement Hugh Robertson
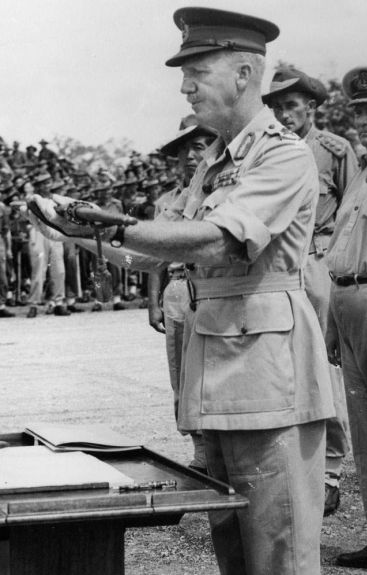
- Major General H.C.H. Robertson accepting the sword of Japanese Lieutenant General Hatazō Adachi following the Japanese surrender, 13 September 1945.
- Born: 29 October 1894; Warrnambool, Victoria
- Died: 28 April 1960 (aged 65); Heidelberg, Victoria
- Military career
- Allegiance: Australia
- Branch: Australian Army
- Service years: 1914–1954
- Rank: Lieutenant General
- Nickname: "Red Robbie"
- Service number: VX20321
- Commands: British Commonwealth Forces Korea (1951); British Commonwealth Occupation Force (1946–51); Southern Command (1946, 1953–54); First Australian Army (1945–46); 6th Division (1945); 5th Division (1945); Western Command (1944–45); III Corps (1944); 2nd Division (1943–44); 1st Armoured Division (1942–43); 1st Cavalry Division (1942); 19th Infantry Brigade (1940–41); 7th Military District (1939–40)
- Conflicts: First World War; Gallipoli Campaign; Sinai and Palestine Campaign; Second World War; Western Desert Campaign; New Guinea Campaign; New Britain Campaign; Occupation of Japan; Korean War
- Awards: Knight Commander of the Order of the British Empire; Distinguished Service Order; Mentioned in Despatches (4); Officer of the Order of the Nile (Egypt); Chief Commander of the Legion of Merit (United States); Taegeuk Order of Military Merit (Korea)

Lieutenant General Sir Horace Clement Hugh Robertson, KBE, DSO (29 October 1894 – 28 April 1960) was a senior officer in the Australian Army who served in the First World War, the Second World War and the Korean War. He was one of the first graduates of the Royal Military College, Duntroon, to reach the ranks of major general and lieutenant general.

During the First World War, Robertson served with the 10th Light Horse in the Gallipoli Campaign, including the disastrous Battle of the Nek, where much of his regiment was wiped out. He later participated in the Sinai and Palestine Campaign, where he captured a Turkish Army general, and was awarded the Distinguished Service Order.

During the Second World War, Robertson led the 19th Infantry Brigade at the Battle of Bardia and accepted the surrender of the Italian Navy at Benghazi. Later, he commanded the 1st Armoured Division in Western Australia. In the final weeks of the war he commanded troops in the closing stages of the New Britain Campaign and the Aitape–Wewak campaign. At the end of the war, he accepted the surrender of Japanese Lieutenant General Hatazō Adachi.

Following the war, he commanded the British Commonwealth Occupation Force in the Occupation of Japan and the British Commonwealth Forces Korea in the Korean War. Robertson was a key figure in establishing the Australian Armoured Corps. Its headquarters in Darwin is named Robertson Barracks in his honour.

== Early life ==
Horace Clement Hugh Robertson was born in Warrnambool, Victoria, on 29 October 1894, the sixth child of John Robertson, a state school teacher, and his wife Anne née Grey. Horace was educated at a state school in Outtrim, from May 1905 to April 1910, when he went to The Geelong College. Horace was nicknamed "Red Robbie" by his fellow schoolboys after his hair colour, in contrast to his older brother John, or "Black Robbie".

In October 1911 Robertson took the entrance examination for the Royal Military College, Duntroon, and was accepted into the second intake of cadets in 1912. His class was due to be commissioned on 1 January 1916, but the outbreak of the First World War in August 1914 caused it to be graduated early. He was commissioned as a lieutenant in both the Permanent Military Forces (PMF) and the Australian Imperial Force (AIF) on 3 November 1914.

On 7 November 1914, Robertson married Jessie Bonnar in a private service at a registry office in Collingwood. The ceremony was kept secret, because at the time junior officers required the Army's permission to marry, and at age 20 Robertson would not have received it. Later they would claim that they had been married in 1916. Their marriage produced no children.

== First World War ==
Major General William Bridges decided that the Duntroon cadets, none of whom had yet finished their training, should be split up and posted to the various units of the AIF as regimental rather than staff officers. Robertson was posted to the 10th Light Horse as its machine-gun officer. He was one of seven members of his class in the 3rd Light Horse Brigade. By the end of August 1915, three of them would be dead.

The 10th Light Horse was concentrated at Claremont, Western Australia, before departing for the Middle East on the transport Mashobra in February 1915. After arriving at Alexandria, Egypt, in March 1915, the regiment moved to Mena Camp near Cairo. In May, the 3rd Light Horse Brigade began moving, without horses, to Gallipoli, preceded by the machine-gun sections, which embarked at Alexandria on 8 May 1915. At Gallipoli, the machine guns were brigaded together to provide additional firepower. Robertson's machine guns were in support during the disastrous Battle of the Nek on 7 August 1915, during which much of the 10th Light Horse became casualties. Afterwards, Robertson was promoted to captain and became second in command of A Squadron. He assumed command of C Squadron on 28 August, and led it in the fighting at Hill 60 the next day.

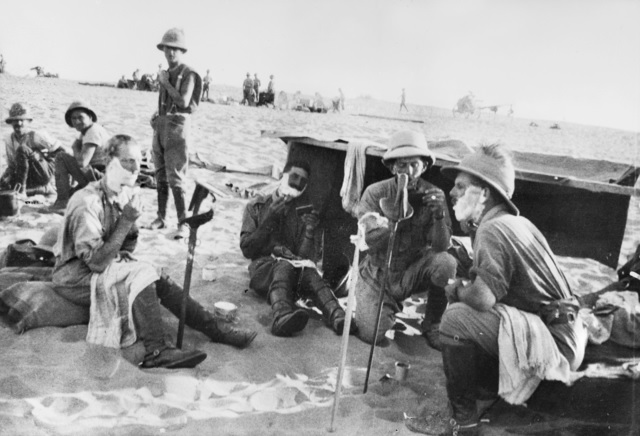
Officers of the 10th Light Horse Regiment shaving prior to the Battle of Romani in July 1916. Robertson is the one on the left.

The 10th Light Horse was reorganised after returning to Egypt in January 1916, and Robertson assumed command of B Squadron, with the AIF rank of major from May 1916. This was as far as he could go, for Duntroon graduates could not be promoted above major in the AIF. This was the result of an AIF policy aimed at giving them a broad a range of experience, which would benefit the post-war Army, while not allowing an accumulation of young officers of high rank, for whom the reduced post-War Army would not have sufficient posts. His substantive rank remained that of lieutenant; he would not be promoted to the substantive rank of captain in the PMF until 30 September 1920, and promotion to major would not come until 1 July 1932. At the Battle of Magdhaba, his colonel was wounded and Robertson took over command of the 10th Light Horse. He was awarded the Distinguished Service Order (DSO) for his actions during this battle. His citation read:

For distinguished and gallant service in the field. He led a mounted charge and was the first officer to enter the enemy's trenches. He is an officer of exceptional organising and training powers and thoroughly deserves reward.

Robertson's men took many Turkish prisoners, including a senior officer of engineers who insisted that he would only surrender his sword to the Australian officer in charge. He was disappointed to discover that it was Robertson, a youthful major, but handed it over anyway.

In February 1917 Robertson was attached to the Desert Column as a staff officer. From there, he was sent to staff school in Egypt. However, on 7 March he suffered a broken leg in a riding accident and was hospitalised for two months. He returned to the staff school in May and finally graduated on 17 June. He was then posted to the newly formed Yeomanry Mounted Division as a General Staff Officer (Grade 3). In March 1918, he was posted to Headquarters Delta Force in Cairo. This was disbanded in April and Robertson became Deputy Assistant Adjutant General (DAAG) at AIF Headquarters in Cairo. In January 1919, he became Assistant Adjutant General (AAG). He returned to Australia in July 1919. In addition to his Distinguished Service Order, he was twice mentioned in despatches, and awarded the Order of the Nile (4th Class) by the Sultan of Egypt.

== Between the wars ==
On returning to Australia, Robertson became brigade major in the 7th Light Horse Brigade. In September 1920 he was posted to the staff of the 3rd Military District and then the 2nd Cavalry Division and the 3rd Division. In April 1922 he sat for and passed the entrance examination to the Staff College, Camberley, where his class included Majors Arthur Percival, John Smyth and Georges Vanier, and Lieutenant Colonel Harry Crerar. Robertson eventually became the first Australian to graduate with an A-grade pass.

Afterwards, Robertson went on to attend a series of shorter training courses in Britain. He attended the School of Musketry at Hythe, Kent; the Machine Gun School at Netheravon, Wiltshire; the Artillery College at Woolwich; the Anti-Gas School at Porton Down; the Anti-Aircraft School at Westerham, Kent; and the Royal Tank Corps School at Woolwich. He returned to Australia in 1925 to become Chief Instructor at the Small Arms School at Randwick, New South Wales in 1926. Following the retirement of General Sir Harry Chauvel in 1930, Robertson was posted to the 7th Infantry Brigade as its brigade major. In 1931 he became brigade major of the 1st Cavalry Brigade in Queensland. He returned to Sydney in February 1934 as General Staff Officer (Grade 2) at the 2nd District Base. In June 1934, he was appointed Director of Military Art at the Royal Military College, which had been transferred to Victoria Barracks, Sydney, as a cost-cutting measure during the Great Depression. It returned to Canberra in 1937, and Robertson returned with it.

Robertson was finally breveted as a lieutenant colonel in June 1936. The rank became substantive in July 1937. Like other regular officers, Robertson was opposed to the "Singapore strategy", and therefore to the defence policy of the government of the day, and said so publicly in the British Army Quarterly. Robertson argued for a local defence of Australia by land and air units. The naval theorist, Admiral Sir Herbert Richmond, responding to Robertson's arguments in an editorial, pointed out that local defence would fragment the British Empire's defence effort and could not secure the sea lanes. However, in view of the weakness of the Royal Navy, Richmond was forced to concede that Robertson's approach was not unreasonable.

== Second World War ==
=== Libya ===
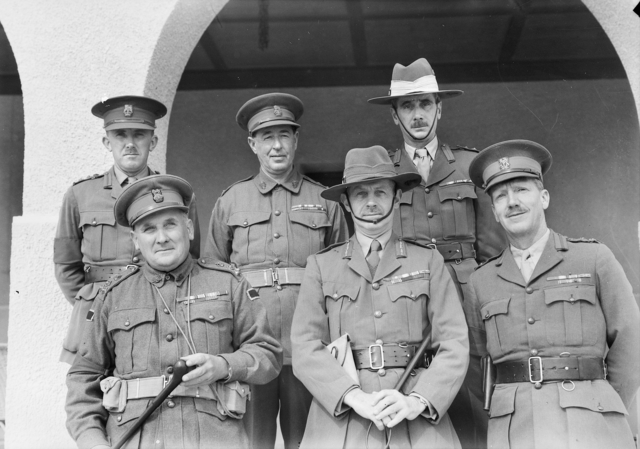
Senior officers of the 6th Division, December 1940. Front row, left to right: Brigadier Arthur Allen, Major General Iven Mackay, Brigadier Horace Robertson. Back row, left to right: Colonel Frank Berryman, Brigadier Stanley Savige, Colonel Alan Vasey.

In March 1939, Robertson was appointed commander of the 7th Military District, which encompassed the Northern Territory. It was his first command since the First World War. He was promoted to the temporary rank of colonel in August 1939, and this became substantive in November. The job involved cooperation with the Royal Australian Navy and Royal Australian Air Force, and the administration of a company of regular soldiers known as the Darwin Mobile Force. After the Second World War began in September 1939, Robertson became responsible for supplying the 7th Military District's quota of volunteers for the Second Australian Imperial Force (AIF). A strike on the waterfront saw Robertson committing troops to help unload cargo.

On 4 April 1940, Robertson joined the Second AIF himself, with the rank of brigadier, and was allocated the AIF service number VX20321. He was appointed to command the 19th Infantry Brigade, which was then being formed from units made surplus by the reduction of the 6th Division from 12 infantry battalions to nine. All three of its battalions, the 2/4th, 2/8th and 2/11th Infantry Battalions, were initially commanded by over-age officers, but the commander of the 2/4th was replaced by Ivan Dougherty in August. Initially, Dougherty received a cool reception from Robertson, who was disappointed at being unable to select his own battalion commanders, but Dougherty soon made such a good impression that when Robertson went on leave in October 1940 he recommended that Dougherty act as brigade commander, despite the fact that he was the youngest and most junior of Robertson's battalion chiefs.

The Battle of Bardia brought to the fore the simmering hostility between regular officers and reservists. Frank Berryman, the 6th Division's General Staff Officer (Grade 1), and Alan Vasey, the Deputy Assistant Adjutant and Quartermaster General (DA&QMG), were eager for Robertson to do well and show that Staff Corps officers could make good commanders, and if that could be done at the expense of an old-style reservist like Stanley Savige, so much the better. They pushed for Robertson's 19th Infantry Brigade, then in reserve, to be committed when the attack by Savige's 17th Infantry Brigade slowed down. The abrupt manner in which this was done generated antipathy between Robertson and Savige.

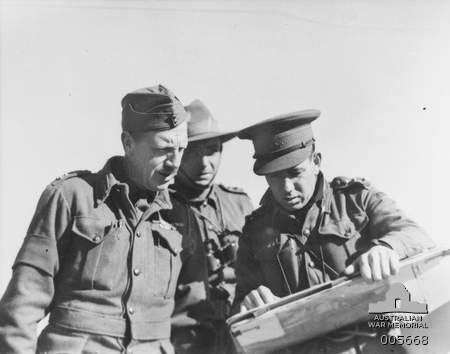
Robertson (left) confers with Captain R.I. Ainslie and Captain Greave during the Derna action.

The 19th Infantry Brigade then advanced on Tobruk. The attack on this fortified town proceeded along similar lines to that on Bardia, with the 16th Infantry effecting a break-in of the position, but this time the 19th Infantry Brigade was to carry out the exploitation phase. Robertson's contribution to the plan was to increase its tempo, so that the attack would be carried through without pause, the exploitation being carried out before the initial break-in was complete. Robertson accepted the surrender of the fortress commander, Generale di Corpo d'Armata Pitassi Mannella, and later Admiral Massimiliano Vietina, the Italian naval commander. Comments by "a sunburnt red-headed Australian brigadier" made headlines in Britain, where senior officers rarely spoke to the media, but did not endear Robertson to his critics, who felt that his ego was out of control. Following the entry of the 19th Infantry Brigade to Benghazi on 7 February, Robertson declared "give me two stout ships and a bearing on Rome and we'll dine in the hall of the caesars".

For this campaign, Robertson was made a Commander of the Order of the British Empire (CBE), but later that month he was hospitalised for varicose veins in the leg he had broken in 1917. He was replaced as commander of the 19th Infantry Brigade by Alan Vasey. When Robertson recovered he was given responsibility for the training of AIF reinforcements in the Middle East. Robertson's service in the field and his long experience in training troops made him an ideal candidate for the post. For his services, Robertson was mentioned in despatches a third time.

=== Defence of Australia ===
Around the time of the outbreak of war with Japan, many senior officers with distinguished records in the Middle East were recalled to Australia to lead militia formations and fill important staff posts. One of these was Robertson, who was recalled to take command of the 1st Cavalry Division in January 1942. In March 1942, an unusual event occurred. Major Generals Alan Vasey and Edmund Herring, and Brigadier Clive Steele, fearing that Gordon Bennett or John Lavarack was about to be appointed Commander in Chief, approached the Minister for the Army, Frank Forde, with a proposal that in view of the danger of an invasion of Australia, all officers over the age of 50 be immediately retired and Robertson be appointed Commander in Chief. This reflected an extraordinary endorsement of Robertson by his colleagues, but such favourable opinion was not universally held. Sydney Rowell later explained that:

Robbie, although in Sydney, was not unaware of what was going on. The thing that really riled me was Vasey's saying that "perhaps Robbie's vices in peace would be virtues in war, to which I replied that "if meanmindedness and disloyalty could be counted as virtues at any time I might be prepared to go along with him."

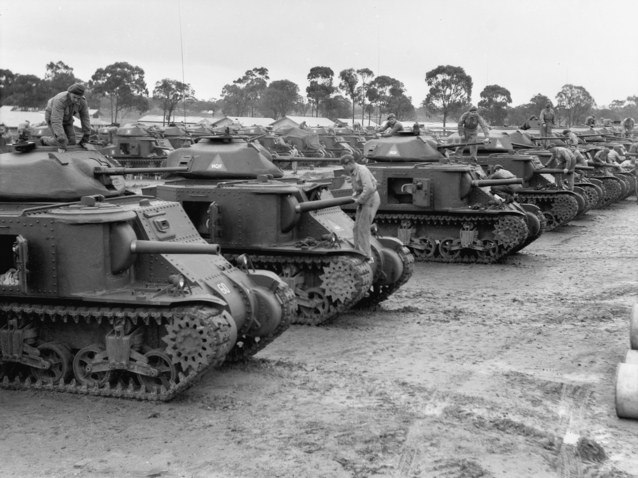
General Grant M3 Medium Tanks of the 1st Armoured Division

The "revolt of the generals" collapsed with the welcome news that Blamey was returning from the Middle East to become Commander in Chief. In the reorganisation of the Army that followed, Robertson was appointed to command the 1st Armoured Division. Initially, the 1st Armoured Division had a key role in the defence of Australia as a mobile reserve, but it was only partly trained and equipped, representing another major challenge to Robertson as a trainer of troops. When the prospect of an invasion of Australia became remote, the 1st Armoured Division was sent to Western Australia in January 1943, where it became part of Bennett's III Corps. The area became a backwater and the 1st Armoured Division was slowly broken up and then disbanded. To recoup some of the nation's investment in training for armoured warfare, Robertson arranged for 25 officers to be seconded to the British 7th Armoured Division in Europe. Following the disbandment of the 1st Armoured Division, Robertson took over command of the 2nd Division, the other division in Western Australia, and then, upon Bennett's retirement, III Corps in April 1944. This too was disbanded in June 1944 and Robertson took over Western Command.

Because the Army reached its greatest extent in 1942 and shrank in size thereafter, Blamey was faced with a limited number of senior appointments and more senior officers than he needed to fill them. He faced public and political criticism over "shelving" senior officers, including Robertson. That Robertson and Bennett, two troublesome potential rivals of Blamey's, had been sent to Western Australia did not escape comment. However, it was always more likely that Robertson would be the one recalled. Nevertheless, Blamey had serious concerns about Robertson's health, after the latter was hospitalised with internal haemorrhaging in July 1944 and sent to the eastern states to convalesce. While there he joined Vasey and Brigadier Bertrand Coombes, the Commandant of Duntroon, in conducting an inquiry into the future training and organisation of the Royal Military College. Their report, submitted to Blamey in January 1945, called for a number of reforms, the most significant being that the postings of regular officers should alternate between staff and regimental duties.

=== New Guinea ===
In April 1945, Robertson returned to the field, replacing Alan Ramsay as commander of the 5th Division, which was then engaged in the final stages of the New Britain Campaign. In July, Robertson became commander of the 6th Division, leading it through the final days of the Aitape–Wewak Campaign. On 13 September 1945, Robertson accepted the surrender of Lieutenant General Hatazō Adachi, and his Japanese Eighteenth Army. In December 1945, Robertson took over command of the First Army, becoming one of a select number of Australians to command such a formation, at least on paper, with the rank of lieutenant general. For the final campaigns, Robertson was mentioned in despatches a fourth time.

=== Occupation of Japan ===
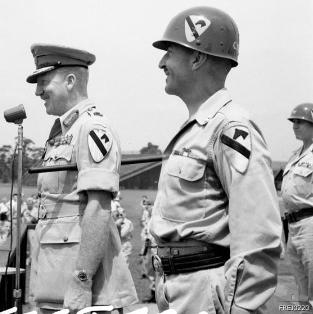
Major General William C. Chase (right) inducts Robertson as an honorary member of the 1st Cavalry Division.

Robertson returned to Australia in March 1946 to take over Southern Command. In June he was appointed to replace Lieutenant General John Northcott as commander of the British Commonwealth Occupation Force (BCOF) in the occupation of Japan. Northcott had negotiated the Northcott-MacArthur agreement in January 1946 with General of the Army Douglas MacArthur, which governed the terms and conditions under which the BCOF would occupy part of Japan. They agreed that the BCOF would serve under American command, with American policy being followed. It remained to make the occupation work. Robertson had a poor relationship with the British component commander, Major General David Tennant Cowan, who resented being placed under an Australian officer. "It did not occur to me", Robertson later wrote, "that officers of the British and Indian armies looked upon us from Australia and New Zealand as they looked upon Indians, and were prepared to do anything to avoid being publicly commanded by us."

The British government's principal interest in Japan was to renew pre-war trade concessions, and to secure new ones; it was particularly interested in the port city of Kobe. The Americans blocked these attempts. Robertson clashed repeatedly with Lieutenant General Sir Charles Gairdner, the official representative of the prime minister of the United Kingdom. Gairdner was nominally senior in rank to Robertson until March 1947, when Robertson was promoted to the substantive rank of lieutenant general, backdated to January 1944. Robertson resisted Gairdner's requests for BCOF aircraft for personal purposes.

== Korean War ==
By mid-1950, the BCOF was winding down. All the contingents other than the Australians had departed, and the Australians were preparing to leave. For his services as commander of the BCOF, Robertson was created a Knight Commander of the Order of the British Empire (Military Division) (KBE) in the King's Birthday Honours List. Robertson intended to travel to London to be invested by King George VI but his plans were disrupted by the outbreak of the Korean War on 25 June 1950. Robertson passed on to the Australian government requests from MacArthur for BCOF assistance, which were agreed to. He committed the frigate HMAS Shoalhaven and No. 77 Squadron RAAF but, although authorised to do so, he hesitated to deploy the 3rd Battalion, Royal Australian Regiment, as he considered the risks too great.

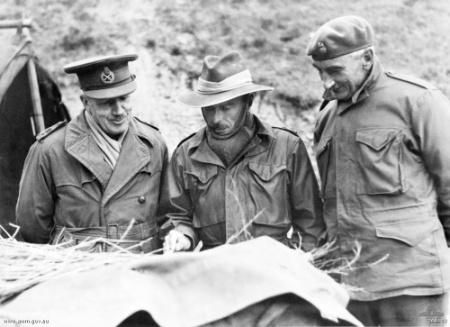
Robertson (left) in Korea with Lieutenant Colonel I. B. Ferguson of 3rd Battalion, Royal Australian Regiment and Brigadier Basil Coad, the commander of the 27th Commonwealth Brigade

Robertson built up what became the British Commonwealth Forces Korea (BCFK). While the British government had hoped to have the Americans supply all their logistic support, Robertson realised that this was impossible. The US Army was being stretched to its limit just supporting itself and the army of the Republic of Korea, and British Commonwealth equipment was different in many respects. The British Army then scrambled to meet its own logistic needs, creating ad hoc arrangements and requesting support from Robertson and MacArthur. The Chief of the General Staff, Sydney Rowell, sent a cable to his British counterpart, Field Marshal Sir William Slim, warning of "a bugger's muddle in which the only people to suffer will be the soldiers". Slim agreed; a Maintenance Area was established in Korea to support Commonwealth forces there, which drew some resources from American sources, such as petrol, oil and lubricants, engineer stores, casualty evacuation and port operations, and the rest from BCOF in Japan.

Once again, the British government did not wish to entrust its interests in Japan to a foreign officer, so the British Chiefs of Staff appointed Air Vice Marshal Cecil Bouchier as their representative at MacArthur's headquarters. His brief made it clear that he had no responsibility or authority over the BCOF or Commonwealth forces in Korea. After rashly ordering the 27th British Commonwealth Brigade to Pusan without transport or heavy equipment, much to Robertson's annoyance, Bouchier did attempt to confine himself to acting solely as a liaison officer. Following the dismissal of General Douglas MacArthur, Robertson held a press conference in which he defended the general and his conduct of the war. This constituted an implicit condemnation of the British government's policy. Soon after, during the Battle of the Imjin River, Robertson was consulted by the Americans about the possible consequences of the loss of the 1st Battalion, the Gloucestershire Regiment, and he advised them not to endanger the rest of the I Corps line with a rescue attempt. For his services in the Korean War, he was awarded the American Legion of Merit, and the South Korean Order of Military Merit.

== Later life ==
Robertson was recalled to Australia in November 1951, replacing Sir Edmund Herring as Director General of Recruiting. In January 1953, Robertson took over Southern Command again. This put him in uncomfortably close proximity to Rowell, however, and the two clashed over a number of minor issues. Robertson turned 60 on 29 October 1954, and retired the next day, after racking up 3,985 days of active service in 43 years in the Australian Army. From 1954 to 1960, he was honorary colonel of the Royal Australian Regiment. In retirement Robertson served on the committee of the Metropolitan Golf Club and was president of the Victorian branch of the Royal Empire Society for a time. He commenced writing his memoirs, which he promised would be "the million pound libel". The fate of the papers he gathered for it and the unfinished manuscript itself is unknown.

On 28 April 1960 he suffered a ruptured aorta and died at the Repatriation General Hospital, Heidelberg. His sudden death came as a shock to many. A funeral with full military honours was held at Scots' Church, Melbourne. For pall bearers, he had eight generals: Leslie Beavis, Allan Boase, Cyril Clowes, Hector Edgar, Ragnar Garrett, Edmund Herring, Sydney Rowell and Colin Simpson. Frank Kingsley Norris carried his decorations while the 2nd Battalion, Royal Australian Regiment and 1st Armoured Regiment provided honour guards for the largest military funeral since Blamey's in 1951. Afterwards, he was buried with his wife, who had died in 1956, at Springvale Botanical Cemetery. The Robertson Barracks was later named in his honour.

== Notes ==
Military offices
| New command | C-in-C British Commonwealth Forces Korea; 1950–1951 | Succeeded by Lieutenant General William Bridgeford |
| Preceded by Lieutenant General John Northcott | C-in-C British Commonwealth Occupation Force; 1946–1951 | Succeeded by Lieutenant General William Bridgeford |
| Preceded by Lieutenant General Vernon Sturdee | GOC First Australian Army; 1945–1946 | Formation disbanded |
