= Stanley Savige =

Australian Army soldier and officer

Sir Stanley George Savige
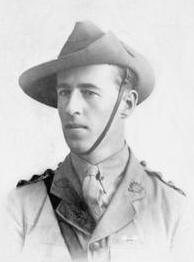
- Captain Stanley Savige of the Australian Imperial Force, 1918
- Born: 26 June 1890; Morwell, Victoria
- Died: 15 May 1954 (aged 63); Kew, Victoria
- Burial place: Boroondara General Cemetery
- Military career
- Allegiance: Australia
- Branch: Australian Army
- Service years: 1915–1946
- Rank: Lieutenant General
- Nickname: Stan
- Service number: VX13
- Commands: II Corps (1944–45); New Guinea Force (1944); I Corps (1944); 3rd Division (1942–44); 17th Infantry Brigade (1939–41); 10th Infantry Brigade (1935–39); 24th Infantry Battalion (1928–35); 37th Infantry Battalion (1924–28); Urmia Force (1918)
- Conflicts: First World War; Gallipoli Campaign; Battle of Pozières; Battle of Mouquet Farm; Battle of Bullecourt; Battle of Passchendaele; Caucasus Campaign; Battle of Baku; Second World War; North African Campaign; Battle of Greece; Syria–Lebanon Campaign; New Guinea campaign; Operation Cartwheel; Bougainville Campaign
- Awards: Knight Commander of the Order of the British Empire; Companion of the Order of the Bath; Distinguished Service Order; Military Cross; Mentioned in Despatches (4); Greek War Cross (Class A)
- Other work: Founder, Legacy Australia; Director, Olympic Tyre & Rubber Co. Ltd; Chairman, Moran & Cato Ltd.; Chairman, Central War Gratuity Board; Commissioner, State Savings Bank of Victoria

Lieutenant General Sir Stanley George Savige, KBE, CB, DSO, MC, ED (26 June 1890 – 15 May 1954) was an Australian Army soldier and officer who served in the First World War and Second World War.

In March 1915, after the outbreak of the First World War, Savige enlisted in the First Australian Imperial Force. He served in the ranks during the Gallipoli Campaign, and received a commission. He later served on the Western Front, where he was twice recommended for the Military Cross for bravery. In 1918, he joined Dunsterforce and served in the Caucasus Campaign, during which he was instrumental in protecting thousands of Assyrian refugees. He subsequently wrote a book, Stalky's Forlorn Hope, about his experiences. After the war he played a key role in the establishment of Legacy Australia, the war widows and orphans benefit fund.

During the early years of the Second World War, Savige commanded the 17th Infantry Brigade in the North African Campaign, the Battle of Greece and Syria–Lebanon Campaign. His outspoken criticism of professional soldiers earned him their rancour. He returned to Australia in early 1942, and later commanded the 3rd Division in the Salamaua–Lae campaign. He ultimately rose to the rank of lieutenant general in the Australian Army, commanding the II Corps in the Bougainville Campaign.

In later life, Savige was a director of Olympic Tyre & Rubber Ltd from 1946 to 1951 and chairman of Moran & Cato Ltd from 1950 to 1951. He was also chairman of the Central War Gratuity Board from 1946 to 1951, and a commissioner of the State Savings Bank of Victoria.

== Early life ==
Stanley Savige was born on 26 June 1890, in Morwell, Victoria, the eldest of eight children to Samuel Savige, a butcher, and his wife Ann Nora, née Walmsley. Stan Savige left Korumburra State School at the age of twelve to work as a blacksmith's striker. While at Korumburra, he enlisted in the school junior cadets as a bugler.

The family moved to Prahran, Victoria, in 1907, where Savige worked at a variety of jobs and served in the Prahran senior cadets for 18 months, from 1907 to 1909. He became a scoutmaster, forming the First Yarra Troop. Savige was an active member of the South Yarra Baptist Church, where he was a Sunday school teacher. Through his church activities, Savige met Lilian Stockton, to whom he became engaged on New Year's Day, 1914.

== First World War ==
=== Gallipoli ===
Savige enlisted in the First Australian Imperial Force (AIF) on 6 March 1915, and was posted to the 24th Infantry Battalion, which departed Melbourne for Egypt on the transport Euripides on 8 May 1915. He was passed over for a commission due to his lack of education, but was promoted to corporal on 30 April and lance sergeant on 8 May. The 24th Infantry Battalion landed at Gallipoli on 5 September 1915 and took over part of the line at Lone Pine. Savige became company sergeant major on 20 September. There, he was commissioned as a second lieutenant on 9 November 1915. During the evacuation of Gallipoli in December 1915, Savige was one of three officers chosen to serve with the battalion rearguard.

=== Western Front ===
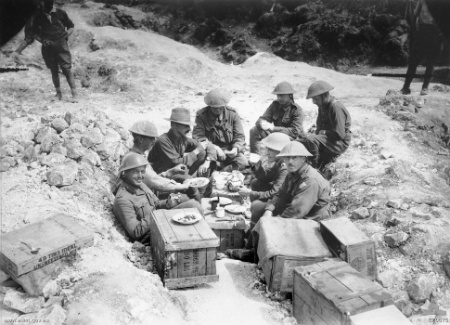
Brigadier General John Gellibrand and his staff having breakfast in a shell hole in Sausage Valley. Captain Savige is furthest from the camera.

After a brief period of rest and reorganisation in Egypt, the 2nd Division—of which the 24th Infantry Battalion was part—embarked for France on 21 March 1916. Savige became commander of the battalion scout platoon and led a number of night patrols into no man's land. On 12 April, he became battalion intelligence officer and he was promoted to lieutenant on 1 May. Coming to the attention of his brigade commander, Brigadier General John Gellibrand, Savige was attached to 6th Infantry Brigade headquarters as a trainee brigade intelligence officer. "We expected a lot of the new B. I. O.," Gellibrand later recalled, "and we got it." Savige served in operations at Pozières and Mouquet Farm in July and August 1916. At one point he ran through heavy shellfire on an errand. The orderly who went into it with him was never seen again. Savige was promoted to captain on 15 September. On 8 November, he was wounded at Flers but remained on duty. However, on 20 December he was admitted to hospital, suffering from influenza. Savige rejoined the 24th Infantry Battalion on 5 January 1917 and was appointed adjutant on 3 February.

In February 1917, the German Army began a withdrawal from its positions in the Somme sector to the Hindenburg Line. Gellibrand was in temporary command of the 2nd Division, which at this time was opposite the village of Warlencourt. Patrols from the 6th Infantry Brigade found Warlencourt empty and occupied it unopposed. The 24th Infantry Battalion kept in contact with the Germans as they pulled back. On 13 March, the 24th Infantry battalion—now responsible for the entire brigade front—found Grévillers empty and occupied it. By 17 March 1917, the trenches in front of Bapaume were empty and the 6th Infantry Brigade occupied its northern suburbs.

In the Second Battle of Bullecourt during May 1917, the 6th Infantry Brigade managed to penetrate the Hindenburg Line but its hold was precarious, as the 5th Infantry Brigade on its flank had not been able to manage the same feat. The brigade then faced strong German counter-attacks. Savige was in the front trench, where he attempted to coordinate the 24th Infantry Battalion's defence. The situation, Savige realised, was "somewhat serious". Extraordinary tenacity and bravery was required to hold the position. "The 6th Brigade's achievement on this day," wrote Charles Bean, "had few parallels in the history of the AIF. In the whole line of battle from Vimy to near Quéant, theirs had been almost the only success."

Savige was mentioned in despatches for Bullecourt, and recommended for the Military Cross. His citation read:

For conspicuous gallantry in action at the Hindenburg Line on 3rd May 1917. After assisting to reorganise a party of broken infantry he acted as staff officer to the Senior Officer in the captured position. In this capacity he displayed most commendable coolness, energy and ability, in securing reliable information as to the progress of the action.

Savige was ultimately awarded the Military Cross on 1 January 1918, for both his "consistent good work and devotion to duty" in the period spanning 26 February to 17 March 1917 and his "coolness under fire and tenacity of purpose" during the Second Battle of Bullecourt from April–May 1917. He was mentioned in despatches a second time for his role in the Battle of Passchendaele, although he was originally recommended for a bar to his Military Cross. His citation read:

For conspicuous gallantry. On the night of the 3rd/4th Oct. he assisted in laying out jumping-off and direction tapes at Zonnebeke on which the attacking battalions formed up. He then checked their correctness —This was done under heavy fire. He then helped to guide the attackers to their positions. On the night 8th/9th October. he did similar work on Broodseinde Ridge under particularly heavy fire and throughout the attack on the 9th October. he remained in the forward area gathering information and forwarding it to Brigade Headquarters. This Officer has been on many occasions conspicuous for his gallantry.

Although Savige was informed that the citation had gone through, the medal was never gazetted. He became assistant brigade major of the 6th Infantry Brigade on 10 September and was acting brigade major from 22 November until 11 January 1918.

=== Iran ===
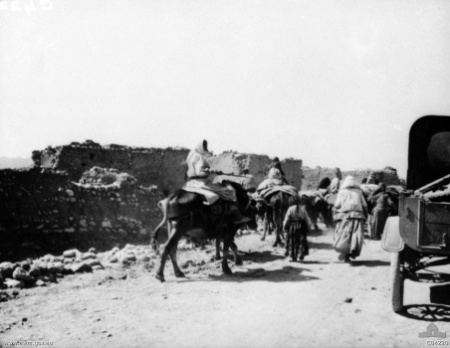
Armenian refugees from the Lakes Van and Urmia districts, passing through Balad Ruz on their way to Bakuba where Dunsterforce had established a camp for their reception in October 1918

Following the abdication of the Russian Tsar in 1917, the Caucasus Front collapsed, leaving the region open to the Turkish Army's Islamic Army of the Caucasus under the command of Enver Pasha and resulting in the flight of thousands of Christian Armenian and Assyrian refugees. The British War Office responded with a plan to send a force of hand-picked British officers and NCOs to organise any remaining Russian forces or civilians who were ready to fight the Turkish forces. A request for Australian officers to participate was sent to the commander of the Australian Corps, General Sir William Birdwood. Some twenty officers, drawn from "the cream of the cream" of Australian leaders, were chosen, including Savige. This force became known as Dunsterforce after its commander, Major General Lionel Charles Dunsterville, the inspiration for the titular character of Rudyard Kipling's novel Stalky & Co. Dunsterforce arrived in Baku in August 1918. It was hoped that, from the Christian Georgian, Armenian and Assyrian people who had supported the Russians and historically feared the Turks, Dunsterforce could raise an army to contain the Turks but "the task proved superhuman".

Following the capture of Urmia by the Turks, Savige discovered tens of thousands of fleeing Assyrian refugees. He deployed a small group of volunteers from his own force, along with refugees, to form a rearguard to hold back the Kurds who were murdering the refugees and carrying off the young girls as slaves. Official Historian Charles Bean later wrote that:

The stand made by Savige and his eight companions that evening and during half of the next day against hundreds of the enemy thirsting like wolves to get at the defenceless throng was as fine as any episode known to the present writer in the history of this war.

Savige was subsequently decorated with the Distinguished Service Order for his efforts on this occasion. His citation read:

For conspicuous gallantry and devotion to duty during the retirement of refugees from Sain Kelen to Tikkaa Tappah, 26/28th July, 1918; also at Chalkaman, 5/6th August. In command of a small party sent to protect the rear of the column of refugees, he by his resource and able dispositions kept off the enemy, who were in greatly superior numbers. He hung on to position after position until nearly surrounded, and on each occasion extricated his command most skilfully. His cool determination and fine example inspired his men, and put heart into the frightened refugees.

For his services in Iran, Savige was also mentioned in despatches a third time. He later wrote a book about his experiences, entitled Stalky's Forlorn Hope, which was published in Melbourne in 1920. In November 1918, he was evacuated to a hospital in Bombay, suffering an attack of malaria, and returned to Australia in January 1919 on the City of Exeter.

== Between the wars ==
Savige married Lilian Stockton on 28 June 1919 at the South Yarra Baptist Church. Their marriage produced a daughter, Gwendolyn Lesley, who was born in 1920. Savige also raised his two nephews, Stanley James and William, after his sister Hilda died in 1924. Savige had to struggle to re-establish himself in civilian life. He was unemployed for a time before finding work with a Melbourne wholesale firm. In 1923 he became sole agent for the Returned Soldiers' Mill in Geelong. He was successful as a salesman and eventually became sole agent for all of Australia. In 1930, he ran unsuccessfully for the Victorian Legislative Assembly Electoral district of Caulfield on the Nationalist Party of Australia ticket.

In 1923, Gellibrand founded the Remembrance Club in Hobart, with the aim of encouraging returned servicemen in business. Savige visited Gellibrand in Hobart during August 1923, and Gellibrand urged him to set up a similar club in Melbourne. Soon after Savige's return to Melbourne, a group of ex-servicemen met to say farewell to one of their number who was about to go to England. Savige used this opportunity to bring up the idea of a club similar to Gellibrand's Remembrance Club. After several informal meetings, the Melbourne club's inaugural meeting was held in Anzac House, Melbourne. Legacy Australia was founded as an ex-servicemen's club, but soon became a charitable organisation focusing on war widows and orphans. For the next 26 years, due to his commitment, energy and enthusiasm, Savige's name became inseparable from both the club and the movement.

Savige joined the Militia on 19 February 1920, with his AIF rank of captain. He served with Headquarters 3rd Division—then under Gellibrand—from July 1921 to November 1924. He commanded the 37th Infantry Battalion from 1 December 1924 to 31 July 1928, the 24th Infantry Battalion from 1 August 1928 to 31 May 1935, and the 10th Infantry Brigade from 1 June 1935 to 12 October 1939. Along the way, he was promoted to major on 1 July 1924, lieutenant colonel on 1 July 1926, colonel on 1 June 1935, and brigadier on 1 May 1938. His promotion, while neither meteoric nor exceptional, was still far faster than that enjoyed by regular officers like Frank Berryman, Horace Robertson, or George Alan Vasey, who had been majors in the AIF but remained at that rank for nearly twenty years, only to find themselves junior to Militia officers like Savige. For his part, Savige was a critic of the regulars. While commander of 10th Infantry Brigade, he insisted that Royal Military College, Duntroon graduates serve first as platoon commanders before assuming staff posts, so they could acquire an understanding of the men. He wrote to Gellibrand:

[Staff Corps] men are taken in hand at an early age and trained only to be soldiers. In peace they are chiefly military clerks with an ability to repeat the contents of the little red books. Some of course get beyond that stage but they are few in number.

== Second World War ==
=== Libya ===
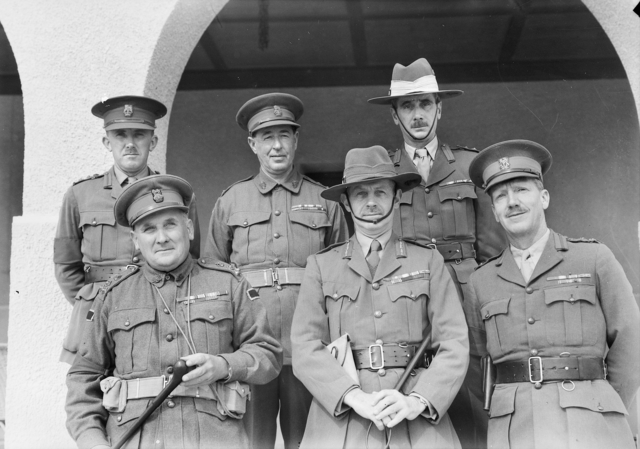
Major General Iven Mackay and his senior officers; Brigadier Savige is in the back row, centre.

Shortly after the outbreak of the Second World War in September 1939, Prime Minister Robert Menzies announced the decision to form a Second Australian Imperial Force. He further directed that all commands in the new 6th Division would go to militiamen. Lieutenant General Sir Thomas Blamey—who was appointed commander of the 6th Division on 28 September—selected Savige to command its 17th Infantry Brigade, the brigade from Victoria. Savige was given the AIF serial number VX13. He and Blamey had worked together when Blamey had commanded the 3rd Division from 1931 to 1937, and Savige was "almost fanatically loyal to Blamey through bad as well as good times". For regular officers, their exclusion from command positions was "the final straw". Savige suspected—accurately in part—that Staff Corps officers were out to get him. A "general atmosphere of criticism and derogation" infected the force that would eventually sour relations between Blamey and some Staff Corps officers.

Considering its inexperience, Savige's 17th Infantry Brigade was given a complicated role in the Battle of Bardia. While the 2/6th Infantry Battalion made a demonstration on the right, the 2/5th Infantry Battalion, reinforced by part of the 2/7th Infantry Battalion, attempted to follow up the 16th Infantry Brigade's attack, with the remainder of the 2/7th in reserve. The brigade had to move in four directions at once. The plan soon went wrong, as the 2/5th in particular suffered a series of mishaps. By nightfall, Colonel Frank Berryman, the divisional chief of staff, had reached the conclusion that the 17th Infantry Brigade had become too tired and disorganised for further effort. This was only partly due to enemy action; the rest was attributable to Berryman's own plan, which had dispersed the brigade and provided it with inadequate armoured and, in the final stages, artillery support. Savige also bore some of the blame, for failing to ensure that his subordinates understood and carried out the plan.

He was a skilful manager of men, using an easy friendly manner to decrease the distance that separated him from his subordinates. He was a sage leader in battle whose approach to all problems was practical and objective. He could write clearly and interestingly and enjoyed writing, whether it was of orders and doctrine for future operations or accounts of past battles; he had a sense of history and the doings of his commands were usually more fully recorded than those of companion formations.

— Gavin Long

At the Battle of Tobruk, Savige's 17th Infantry Brigade was again split up and given a secondary role. However, in the advance on Derna, the brigade managed to beat Robertson's 19th Infantry Brigade to Giovanni Berta. By late February, the campaign was over and Savige was tasked with holding a defensive line near El Agheila. He became convinced that German troops were moving into the area, but his concerns were dismissed by the Brigadier General Staff at I Corps, Brigadier Sydney Rowell. A month later, Savige was proven right when the Afrika Korps pounced on the British forces around El Agheila, but by then he and the 17th Infantry Brigade were in Egypt, preparing for the Battle of Greece. Although the campaign had raised doubts about his suitability for command—mostly resulting from his performance at Bardia, but also with regard to the running feud with Vasey, Berryman and Robertson—Savige was appointed a Commander of the Order of the British Empire. His citation read:

Brigadier Savige commanded the 17th Aust. Inf. Bde in the Battles of Bardia (3–5 Jan) Tobruk (21–22 Jan), Derna (24–31 Jan), and the pursuit to Slonta. He showed fine control organisation and leadership throughout, culminating in an excellent example of initiative and drive which broke the enemy flank west of Derna thus accelerating the enemy retreat and final defeat.

=== Greece and Syria ===
The 17th Infantry Brigade was the last to land in Greece, arriving at Piraeus on 12 April. Savige was placed in charge of Savige Force, consisting of the 2/5th, 2/6th, 2/7th and 2/11th Infantry Battalions, with armour, artillery, engineer and other support. He was given the mission of covering the Allied flank around Kalabaka. On 17 April, Savige received orders to withdraw from Kalabaka, leaving only a rearguard behind. The road behind him, however, was packed with vehicles, and a crucial bridge on the only reasonably good road back had accidentally been demolished. Savige elected to disregard his orders and hold his position until the road was clear. He then managed to withdraw, although his driver's foot was broken in an air raid. Savige arrived back in Palestine on 1 May 1941 and began the task of rebuilding his brigade. For the campaign in Greece, he received his fourth mention in despatches.

Savige did not pretend to be a military genius but only a commander who knew his way around the battlefield because he had learned soldiering the hard way.

— John Hetherington

In June 1941, the 7th Division fought in the Syria–Lebanon Campaign. One of its problems was that it was trying to fight three battles with only two brigades, because the 18th Infantry Brigade that was normally part of the division was engaged in the siege of Tobruk. Accordingly, Savige's 17th Infantry Brigade headquarters was brought in to provide the 7th Division with a third brigade headquarters. Savige was given three battalions that had never worked together before—the 2/3rd and 2/5th Infantry Battalions and 2/2nd Pioneer Battalion. He scored a notable success in the Battle of Damour, which he rated as his most successful battle of the war, although his conduct was not above criticism by Berryman, who felt that Savige had located his headquarters too far back, resulting in failure to seize an important opportunity. Ultimately, though, this had no significant impact on the battle.

By June 1941, Blamey had become concerned about Savige's health. A thorough medical examination in August declared that Savige had reached a stage of complete exhaustion. Blamey therefore decided to send Savige and Brigadier J. J. Murray back to Australia on a recruiting campaign as "a graceful way of retiring with honour two officers who have done useful work in the Middle East but seemed to him unequal to the severe physical demands of fast-moving modern warfare". Savige said goodbye to the three battalions of the 17th Brigade at a special parade at Edsaya in Syria on 15 December 1941. At the time his next post was to have been Director of Recruiting and Propaganda in Australia.

=== Defence of Australia ===
Savige arrived in Australia on 5 January 1942 to find that his new appointment had been changed to commander of the 3rd Division, and he was promoted to the rank of major general two days later. The outbreak of war with Japan prompted a wholesale reorganisation of the forces in Australia and Savige was one of a number of officers with experience in the Middle East who was promoted and given command of a Home Army formation. Savige threw himself into the task of preparing his command for the war, weeding out the physically unfit and incompetent. By May, he had removed some 60 officers. Replacing them was another matter. The division was at less than half strength when Savige assumed command and was filled with large numbers of 18-year-old conscripts. One new arrival was especially welcome: Lieutenant Colonel John Wilton, who was posted as General Service Officer, First Grade (GSO1) in August. Savige later recalled that "I never had a more competent staff, nor such a co-operative team, than that staff after Wilton came along." The 3rd Division moved to southern Queensland in July, where it came under Lieutenant General Edmund Herring's II Corps. In October, Herring succeeded Rowell as commander of New Guinea Force, and Savige became acting corps commander. With his attention focused on the corps, Savige relied on Wilton to supervise the training of the 3rd Division.

=== Wau–Salamaua ===
The 3rd Division was alerted to move to New Guinea in February 1943, but Blamey did not initially intend for Savige to command it, for he felt that "it's very tough going up there", and he still had doubts about Savige's physical fitness. A thorough medical examination cleared the way, and Savige departed for Port Moresby in March 1943. The successful conclusion of the Battle of Wau left the 17th Infantry Brigade—now under Brigadier Murray Moten—at Wau as the only troops in contact with the enemy in the South West Pacific Area. Herring, now in command of New Guinea Force, ordered Savige to threaten the Japanese position at Salamaua; the result was the Salamaua–Lae campaign. Despite the rugged conditions, Savige led from the front. He visited forward positions and flew over frontline areas wearing his scarlet general's cap band to let his men—and any Japanese sniper—know that the general was on the job.

"I know," Blamey replied to a senior staff officer who was urging him to drop Savige, "they say I stick with him because he's my friend. Tell me when he has let me down in this war!" The anti-Savige advocate mentioned a tale which was going about: it was not Savige but a subordinate commander who was doing the real job. "Somebody's got to do the job," Blamey answered. "If a commander can pick a good man, give him a job to do and stand behind him, that is all that matters. If he doesn't stand behind him, he's a bad commander. If anybody can prove to me that Savige has ever let me down, then Savige won't be there."

— John Hetherington

Once again, Savige would not escape controversy. In this case, difficulties arose from the fact that Herring failed to make it clear to Savige and Wilton exactly what was meant by "threaten". What would end up being threatened by Savige's very success was Blamey's plan for the capture of Lae, which called for the Japanese defenders of Lae to be drawn away towards Salamaua. The campaign also included an acrimonious exchange between Savige and American commanders that threatened Allied harmony. This arose, ironically, because of Herring's deliberately vague instructions, which he hoped would ensure Allied harmony.

On 15 August, Blamey and Berryman, now a major general, arrived in Port Moresby. Berryman was sent forward to visit Savige and evaluate his performance, with a brief to pass judgement on Savige's conduct of the campaign—and relieve him if necessary. Although "it was an open secret that Berryman had a very low opinion of Savige's military competence", after surveying the situation for himself, Berryman was forced to admit to Wilton that he "never thought that he would have to admit that Savige was right." Berryman returned to Port Moresby and informed Blamey and Herring that they had misjudged Savige. Nonetheless, in deference to Herring's wishes, Blamey relieved Savige anyway. On 23 August, Savige, bitterly disappointed that he would not see the final capture of Salamaua, handed over the Salamaua operation to the 5th Division under Major General Edward Milford. Savige was awarded a Companion of the Order of the Bath for his services in the Salamaua campaign. His citation read:

Maj-Gen. Savige had control of the Battle for Salamaua from 30 Jun. 43 till his relief on 26 Aug. 43. The battle was finally won on 11 Sep. 43—the credit for victory must rest with Maj-Gen. Savige during whose period of command, the back of the enemy's defence was broken. The nature of the country rendered great assistance to the defender, and careful planning alone enabled the defences to be overcome. The supplying of our forward troops was also a terrific problem.

Maj-Gen. Savige triumphed over all these difficulties, his men were kept supplied, they were encouraged to endure the most dreadful hardships, and to overcome great difficulties of terrain. Maj-Gen. Savige's plans were well conceived and he saw them carried through. The success achieved is of the greatest importance to the Allied cause, and Maj-Gen. Savige by his fine leadership has made a very real contribution to the ultimate success of the United nations.

The victories won over the enemy at the battles for Mubo and Komiatum were due to his well conceived plans and energetic execution.

=== New Guinea ===
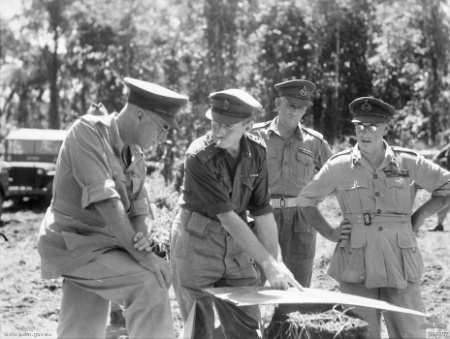
Senior commanders on Bougainville; Savige is on the right.

In February 1944, the appointment of Herring as Chief Justice of the Supreme Court of Victoria led to a vacancy at I Corps, for which General Blamey nominated both Vasey and Savige, but, "having regard to their respective careers", recommended the latter. Army Minister Frank Forde queried Blamey's recommendation, and asked who was the senior officer. Blamey explained that Savige was senior to Vasey—although not as senior as Arthur "Tubby" Allen, James Cannan or Eric Plant. Blamey pointed out that seniority was not the paramount concern for promotion at such a level, and that he was not prepared to recommend these officers at this time, whereupon Forde dropped his objection. General Douglas MacArthur considered Vasey's supersession "outrageous".

On 12 April 1944, Savige's I Corps headquarters moved up from Queensland to relieve that of Berryman's II Corps at Finschhafen. The two staffs had hoped to exchange office equipment, thus saving on shipping, but Advanced LHQ ordered that each should move with all its stores. Instead, the designations of the two corps were exchanged, so that I Corps was still the corps in Australia and II Corps the one in New Guinea. On 20 April, II Corps was ordered to assume the designation and function of New Guinea Force and the existing headquarters of New Guinea Force in Port Moresby was broken up. Savige therefore assumed command of New Guinea Force, his new headquarters opening at Lae on 6 May. At this time, no major combat operations were taking place and activities were winding down in Australian New Guinea. New Guinea Force's main role was rolling up the base installations and shipping units back to Australia. On 9 September 1944, MacArthur discarded the task force organisation. Henceforth the US Sixth Army and Eighth Army and Lieutenant General Vernon Sturdee’s First Army reported directly to him. First Army headquarters arrived at Lae on 1 October and assumed control of Australian troops in New Guinea. At midnight, New Guinea Force was discontinued, and Savige's headquarters became II Corps once more.

=== Bougainville ===
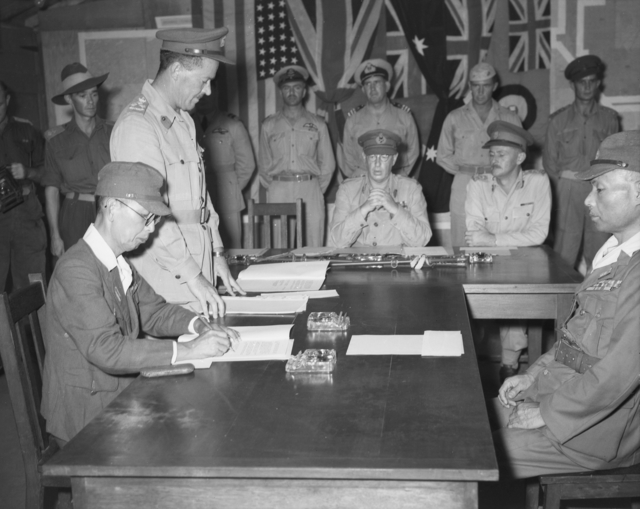
Savige (seated centre, head of table) presides as Lieutenant General Masatane Kanda (seated left) surrenders Japanese forces on Bougainville on 8 September 1945.

Although geographically the largest of the Solomon Islands, Bougainville was politically part of Australian New Guinea and Prime Minister John Curtin desired that Australia should contribute to the garrison. Savige’s II Corps was ordered to "reduce enemy resistance on Bougainville Island as opportunity offers without committing major forces". "To a commander like General Savige, who was not only deeply imbued with the doctrine of aggressiveness which was an AIF article of faith in both world wars but also burning to end his military career in a swirl of action,"" wrote correspondent John Hetherington, Savige's orders "were invitingly flexible." GHQ reckoned that there were no more than 12,000 Japanese left on Bougainville, while LHQ estimated 25,000. Actually, more than 40,000 Japanese were still alive on Bougainville in November 1944.

Savige's sixth and last campaign of the war was free of controversy about his command. Once again, he had a talented regular officer as chief of staff, Brigadier Ragnar Garrett, with whom he had worked in Greece during 1941 and more recently in New Guinea. Moreover, as a corps commander, tactical details could be left to subordinates, although Savige still had to keep a close eye on them to ensure that they did not take unnecessary risks or incur needless casualties. Savige continued to tour the front lines wearing his scarlet cap band and flying his car flag. He also maintained his concern for, and rapport with, the ordinary soldiers under his command. The final campaign on Bougainville cost 516 Australian lives. Some 8,500 Japanese were killed while 9,800 died of other causes, leaving 23,571 still alive when the war ended. On 8 September 1945, Savige accepted their surrender at Torokina.

== After the war ==
From October 1945 to May 1946, Savige served as co-ordinator of demobilisation and dispersal. He transferred to the Reserve of Officers on 6 June. Resuming his business interests, he was a director of Olympic Tyre & Rubber Ltd from 1946 to 1951 and chairman of Moran & Cato Ltd from 1950 to 1951. He was also chairman of the Central War Gratuity Board from 1946 to 1951 and from 1951 a commissioner of the State Savings Bank of Victoria. He was a leader in Melbourne's Anzac Day marches, a patron of a number of his former units' associations, and honorary colonel of the 5th Battalion (Victorian Scottish Regiment).

Blamey recommended Savige for a Knight Commander of the Order of the British Empire for the Salamaua campaign in October 1944. A year later, he recommended Savige for a Knight Commander of the Order of the Bath for the campaign on Bougainville. Both recommendations were turned down by the Labor government. Following the election of the coalition government in the 1949 election, Blamey wrote to the newly elected Prime Minister, Robert Menzies, requesting honours for his generals. This time he was successful, and Savige was appointed a Knight Commander of the Order of the British Empire (Military Division) in the King's Birthday Honours on 8 June 1950. In 1953, he travelled to London to represent Legacy at the coronation of Queen Elizabeth II.

== Death ==
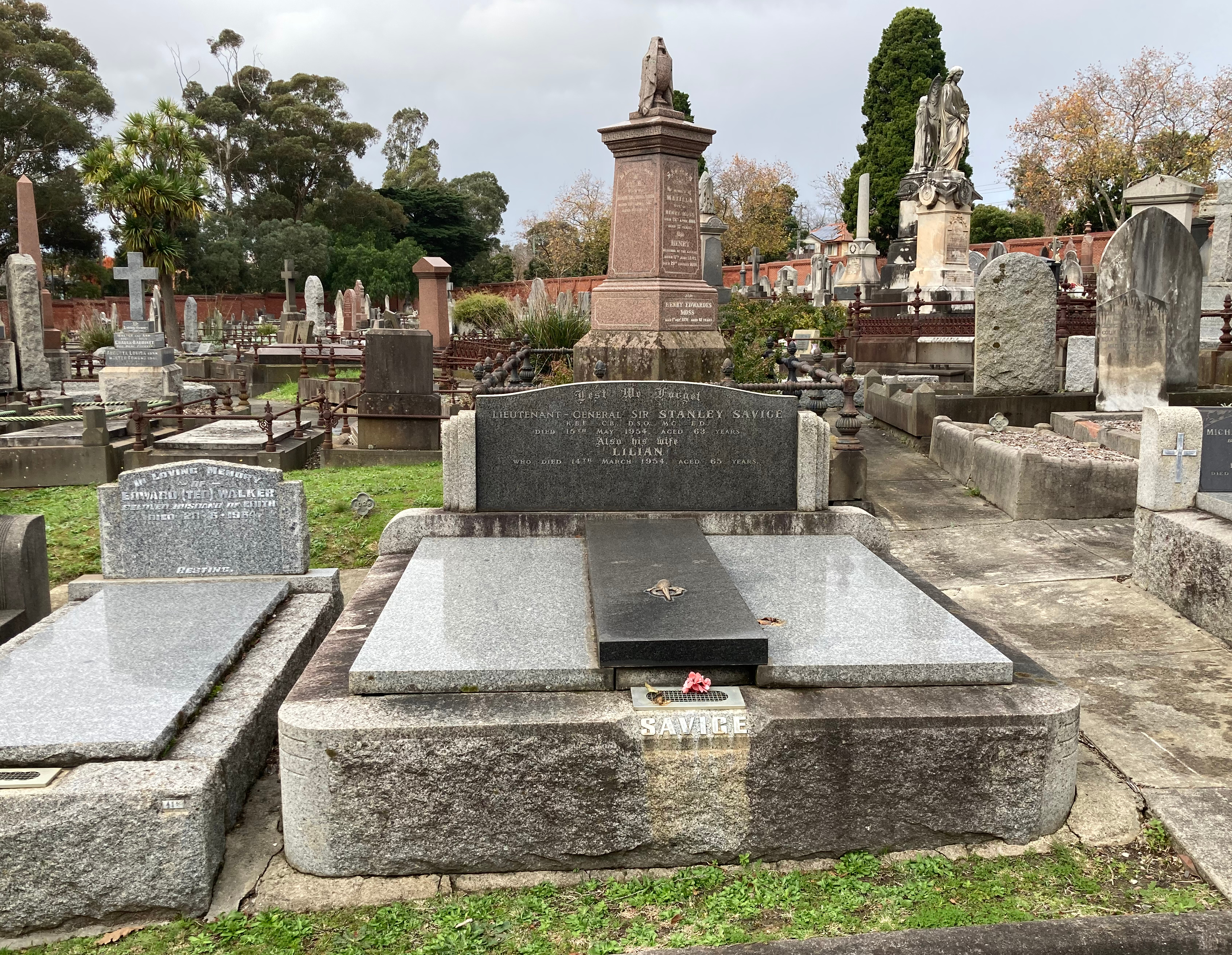
Savige's grave at Boroondara General Cemetery

Savige died of coronary artery disease at his home in Kew, Victoria on 15 May 1954. He was accorded a funeral with full military honours at St Paul's Cathedral, Melbourne. The service was conducted by the Chaplain of Southern Command and Bishop of Geelong, the Right Reverend Dr J. D. McKie, who told the congregation that "Sir Stanley's greatest virtue was humanity. He had great consideration for his troops. He thought that they were not there just to be used, but to be helped." A crowd of 3,000 mourners watched him laid to rest at Kew Cemetery (now Boroondara General Cemetery). Savige left an estate valued at £66,000. He was survived by his daughter Gwendolyn and his nephew Stanley, his wife having died two months earlier. In his will, he directed that his papers be donated to the Australian War Memorial, where they remain. The War Memorial also holds his portrait by Alfred Cook. In August 2006, Australian-Assyrian community leaders from Sydney and Melbourne gathered to commemorate Savige's role in saving Assyrian refugees in 1918, and the mayor of Morwell, Lisa Price, unveiled a bronze bust of the general.

== See also ==
- Witnesses and testimonies of the Armenian Genocide

== Notes ==
Military offices
Preceded by Lieutenant General Frank Berryman	General Officer Commanding II Corps; 1944–1945	Formation inactivated
Preceded by Lieutenant General Sir Edmund Herring	General Officer Commanding I Corps; February – April 1944	Succeeded by Lieutenant General Frank Berryman
Preceded by Major General Edmund Drake-Brockman	General Officer Commanding 3rd Division; 1942–1944	Succeeded by Major General William Bridgeford
