= Victor Secombe =

Australian general

Victor Clarence Secombe
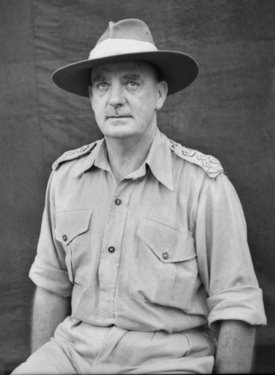
- Brigadier Victor Secombe in Morotai, September 1945
- Born: 9 January 1897; Glen Wills, Victoria
- Died: 3 February 1962 (aged 65); South Brisbane, Queensland
- Burial place: Toowong Cemetery
- Military career
- Allegiance: Australia
- Branch: Australian Army
- Service years: 1915–1954
- Rank: Lieutenant General
- Commands: Eastern Command (1951–52); Northern Command (1950–51, 1952–54); Royal Engineers, 7th Division (1940–41)
- Conflicts: First World War; Western Front; Second World War; Syria-Lebanon campaign; New Guinea campaign
- Awards: Companion of the Order of the Bath; Commander of the Order of the British Empire; Mentioned in Despatches (3); Medal of Freedom (United States)
- Other work: Farmer

Lieutenant General Victor Clarence Secombe, CB, CBE (9 January 1897 – 3 February 1962) was a general officer of the Australian Army. He served in the First and Second World Wars.

Born in Glen Wills near Omeo, Victoria, Secombe graduated from the Royal Military College, Duntroon, in late 1917 and was commissioned as a lieutenant in the Australian Imperial Force. He served with engineering units of the 5th Division during the last months of the First World War. Remaining in the military for the interwar period, he held a number of engineering postings in and later taught at Duntroon. During the early years of the Second World War, he served with the 7th Australian Division during the early stages of the North African Campaign before taking up engineering commands in the South West Pacific Area. After the war he served as Master-General of Ordnance and commanded Northern and Eastern Commands. He retired from the military in 1954 and took up cattle farming. He died in 1962 at the age of 65.

== Early life ==
Victor Clarence Secombe was born on 9 January 1897 at Glen Wills near Omeo, Victoria, to a miner and his wife. Educated initially at Swifts Creek State School, he later attended a boarding school at Ballarat. In 1915 he entered the Royal Military College at Duntroon. He graduated in late 1917.

== Military career ==
Secombe was commissioned as a lieutenant in the Australian Imperial Force in January 1918, and was posted to 15th Field Company, Engineers, on the Western Front. He became adjutant of the 5th Division engineers in January 1919. After attending an engineering course in England he returned to Australia at the end of 1919, and for the next several years held a number of staff positions with Royal Australian Engineer (RAE) units working on coastal defences. From 1922 to 1923, he attended Melbourne University, where he studied civil engineering. By 1936, he had been promoted to major and at the end of the year, joined the teaching staff at Duntroon.

Promoted to temporary lieutenant colonel shortly after the outbreak of the Second World War, he took up command of the engineering elements of 7th Australian Division in 1940. In May 1941, he was promoted to full colonel and became the assistant divisional adjutant and quartermaster-general for the Syria-Lebanon campaign. He was made a Commander of the Order of the British Empire and mentioned in despatches for his work during this time.

In late 1941, Secombe transferred to I Corps headquarters as deputy-director, supply and transport. His new corps soon moved to the South West Pacific Area, and he was based firstly in Java and then in Australia. He was responsible for construction and lines of communication in New Guinea during the campaign there against the Japanese Empire. He held a succession of administrative posts for the remainder of the war. He was mentioned in despatches in 1943 and again after the war, in 1947. Following the Japanese surrender he was appointed the deputy quartermaster-general for the Army, and in 1946 became the Engineer-in-Chief of the General Staff.

Promoted to major general in early 1949, he was Master-General of Ordnance for nearly two years until he was appointed commander of Northern Command, based in Brisbane. His period in charge lasted for 12 months before he took over Eastern Command, based in Sydney. He later returned to Northern Command. He retired from the army on 4 April 1954 as an honorary lieutenant general.

== Later life ==
In 1955, Secombe was appointed a Companion of the Order of the Bath. The same year, he was made colonel commandant of the RAE. In his retirement, he took up cattle farming on a 10,000 acre (4047 ha) property near Gatton, in Queensland. He later purchased an orchard at Kenmore. He died of cancer on 3 February 1962 in the Mater Misericordiae Hospital, South Brisbane, and was buried in Toowong Cemetery. He was survived by his wife, whom he married in 1929, and two children. A son, also a graduate of Duntroon, predeceased him.

Military offices
Preceded by Lieutenant General William Bridgeford	General Officer Commanding Eastern Command; 1951–1952	Succeeded by Lieutenant General Frank Berryman
