= Jessie Vasey =

Australian founder & President of the War Widows' Guild of Australia (1897-1966)

Jessie Mary Vasey CBE (19 October 1897 – 22 September 1966) was the founder and President of the War Widows' Guild of Australia.

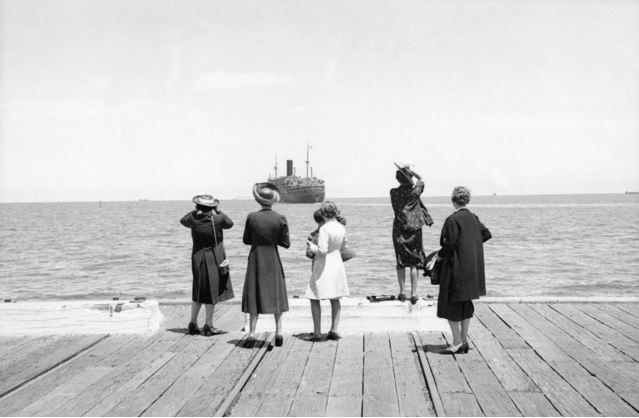
Jessie Vasey (second from the left) on the wharf bidding farewell to the departing troop transport RMS Strathallan carrying her husband George Alan Vasey and the Advance Party of the 6th Division AIF to service overseas. Vasey is flanked by her sisters Thelma Halbert (left) and Doris Sleigh (second from right), and her sister-in-law Marjorie Vasey (right).

== Early life ==
Jessie Mary Vasey was born on 19 October 1897 in Roma, Queensland, the eldest of three daughters of Joseph Halbert, a farmer and grazier, and his wife Jessie, née Dobbin. Young Jessie attended Moreton Bay Girls' High School. The family moved to Victoria in 1911, where Jessie attended Lauriston Girls' School. In 1913, she became a border at the Methodist Ladies' College, Melbourne (MLC). Jessie continued her education at the University of Melbourne living at Trinity College Hostel. She graduated with a Bachelor of Arts with First Class Honours in April 1921.

While at MLC, Jessie became friends with a fellow boarder, Marjorie Vasey, although the latter was seven years her junior. Later the Halbert family moved to Kew, just around the corner from the Vasey family. On 17 May 1921, she married Marjorie's brother, George Alan Vasey, an Australian Army major at St Matthew's Church of England, Glenroy, Victoria. (Like his family, she called him by his middle name.) When a friend asked Alan how he was going to get on married to a blue stocking, he replied "Don't worry – I'll soon have the blue stocking off her".

== Army wife ==
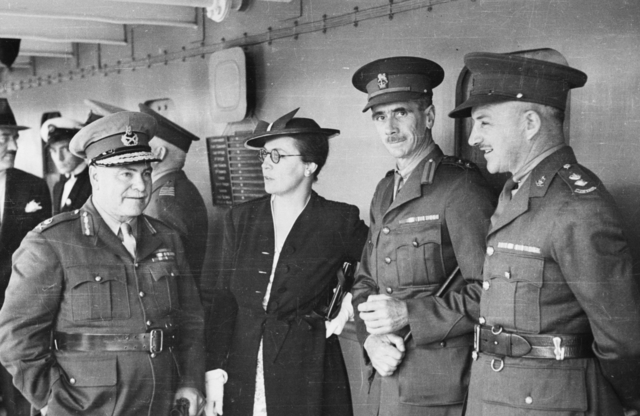
Lieutenant General Sir Thomas Blamey talks with Vasey, Lieutenant Colonel George Alan Vasey and Lieutenant Colonel J. A. Chapman on board the troop transport RMS Strathallan during the embarkation of the Advance Party 6th Division AIF for service overseas.

Alan and Jessie bought a house in Kew with a War Service Loan. Their first child, a son called George Halbert Vasey was born on 31 January 1925. A second son, Robert Alan, was born in 1932. Alan's military career was stagnant, and he remained a major for twenty years. It also forced a number of moves, and the family resided in India from 1928 to 1929 while Alan attended the Staff College at Quetta and again from 1934 from 1937 while he was on exchange with the British Indian Army. The Vaseys sold their house in Kew and Jessie even sold some of the period furniture that had been a wedding gift from her father to pay for expenses involved in the second posting to India.

After Alan was posted back to Melbourne in 1938, they bought a 5.65 Ha property at Wantirna, which they named 'Tiltargara', where they intended to retire. The house was a white weatherboard cottage with a wood stove and no sewage or electricity, requiring kerosene lamps but probably all that they could afford. Alan commuted to Army Headquarters at Victoria Barracks by bus.

Alan sailed for the Middle East in December 1939 as commander of the advance party of the division. Vasey became involved in the Australian Comforts Fund. In May 1940, she became secretary of the AIF Women's Association, a body which sought to help soldiers' wives. Her work with this body drew her attention to the plight of war widows. In a society built around couples, they were single, having lost not only their husbands but also their social status. As such, they were often rejected by their married female friends. Many found themselves facing the awesome responsibility of raising children without fathers. Some found themselves faced with having to make decisions independently for the first time in their lives. They also faced real financial hardships and a cold and seemingly uncaring government bureaucracy.

Alan was supportive of this work. "They come to me... time and time Jess," he told her in 1945, "especially before a show, and say: 'Sir, if anything happens to me you'll see that my wife and kids are all right?' And I tell them... yes, you know bloody well I will."

On 5 March 1945 – just a few days later – Alan was killed in an air crash near Cairns and Jessie became a war widow herself.

== War widow ==
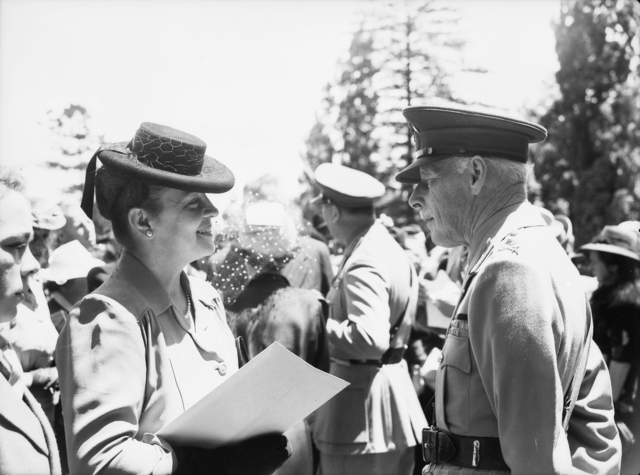
An investiture ceremony was held at Government House where service personnel received awards from the Governor-General of Australia, Field Marshal Prince Henry, Duke of Gloucester. Mrs Jessie Vasey, who received the CB, CBE, and bar to the DSO awarded to her late husband, talks with the Governor of Victoria, Major General Sir Winston Dugan.

Men have always loved women, much as ogres have loved little children, for their own personal consumption

— Jessie Vasey

In October 1945 Vasey sent a letter to all Victorian war widows proposing the formation of a craft guild. Weaving was chosen as there was a post-war textile shortage and it be undertaken in the home while children were at school or asleep. Money earned would supplement the niggardly pensions of the war widows.

Some 300 war widows showed up for an inaugural meeting. A constitution was drawn up and office holders were elected, with Vasey being elected the first president. The War Widows' Craft Guild officially came into existence on 21 January 1946. The AIF Women's Association provide space in its building in Collins Street, Melbourne and the Australian Red Cross opened a nursery nearby for war widows' children.

Vasey travelled around Australia organising guilds in other states. The Guild was established in New South Wales in June 1946, and by early 1947 there were Guilds in every state. This enabled the formation of a federal organisation, with clubs operating at the local level, autonomous state branches, and a national council for liaising with the Commonwealth government and federal organisations, such as the Returned and Services League of Australia. Vasey was elected founding president of the new national organisation at its first conference in 1947.

Vasey set out to obtain an increase in the War Widow's pension. This had originally been introduced during the Great War. A review of pensions in 1920 had set the war widow's pension at £1/2 per week at a time when the basic wage was £3/13 a week. Although war widows were fortunate to avoid a pension cut during the Great Depression, the pension remained unchanged until 1943, when it became £2/10 a week. By this time post-war inflation had eaten away much of its value, leaving many war widows in financial hardship. Vasey resolved that the war widow's pension should be raised to the basic wage, which by 1947 was £5/9 per week.

There were also some anomalies in the pension structure. For example, a serviceman was paid an allowance of 21/6 for the first child and 17/6 for the second; but if he died, the orphan's allowance was just 17/6 and 12/6 respectively.

There was a stigma associated with collecting the pension. "They gave you this £2/10, and you had to go to the post office and get the money handed to you over the counter. And if they were busy at the post office they'd say, 'Just stand aside.'" Vasey argued that the pension was not charity but a statutory right, being compensation for the life of a serviceman. Vasey's attitude would bring her into conflict with charitable groups like Legacy Australia.

The era of the dependent female is passing (a humiliating description of the wife and mother). Married women had a taste of economic freedom during the war and they are not going to forget it lightly...

— Jessie Vasey

In May 1947, the government announced an increase in the widow's pension of 5s per week, but this fell far short of what Vasey was asking for. An ill-timed increase in parliamentary salaries help mobilise public opinion and Vasey held lunchtime rally at Melbourne Town Hall that attracted over 3,000 war widows.

As a result, the Minister for Repatriation, Claude Barnard, agreed to meet with representative of the War Widows' Guild. But while he was prepared to discuss anomalies in the educational and medical benefits to which war widows might be entitled, and to look at the situation of widows with children, he remained unmoved on the question of an increase in pension be paid to childless widows.

Barnard was reported as saying that:

Many of these flappers married these men in a hurry, and a lot of them hoped they would never come back.

The Prime Minister, Ben Chifley attempted to defuse the situation by claiming that Barnard had been misunderstood. He refused to budge on the basic wage, but granted some concessions: war widows with Tuberculosis were granted treatment in repatriation hospitals, and accrued leave owed to deceased soldiers was paid to their widows. The campaign to bring the war widows' pension into line with the basic wage would continue for many years.

If a woman is fond of her children and brings them up all right, then I don't care if she sleeps with ten men a night.

— Jessie Vasey

Perhaps the most controversial clause in the Repatriation Act was Section 43 which stated that a pension could be refused or terminated if the Board felt that the grant or continuance was undesirable. Any widow who remarried could expect to have her pension terminated. Section 43 was wielded as a morality clause against those found to be living in sin. Any widow suspected of having an affair was liable to have her pension terminated. To Vasey, this was an intolerable intrusion on the privacy of war widows, stripping them of their dignity. Vasey and Barnard publicly clashed over the issue between May and September 1949 and the offending clause was ultimately removed from the act.

In 1949, Vasey embarked on her most controversial campaign, to provide housing for elderly war widows. Starting with a £5,000 donation from Sir William Angliss and the proceeds from raffling a car, she obtained a loan to purchase a property. The scheme grew from there. In 1954, the government offered to match pound for pound money spent by voluntary agencies on housing for the elderly, a subsidy which was doubled in 1958. The War Widows' Guild formed a subsidy, Vasey Housing, with Vasey as its managing director. By 1965 it was housing 250 widows in Victoria alone.

Conflict over the scheme arose from the considerably different needs of the elderly widows of previous wars and of the younger, more recent war widows. This would recur when they were joined by war widows from the Vietnam War and war in Afghanistan. Matters came to a head in 1968 when the War Widows Guild formally severed its connection with Vasey Housing.

In recognition of her work on behalf of war widows, Vasey was appointed an Officer of the Order of the British Empire (OBE) in the 1950 King's Birthday Honours, and a Commander (CBE) in the 1963 Queen's Birthday Honours. In 1953 she was sponsored by the Australian government to attend the Coronation of Queen Elizabeth II.

Vasey died of cerebral thrombosis on 22 September 1966 at Grafton, New South Wales, while on her way back to Melbourne after visiting guild members in Queensland. She was buried with Presbyterian forms in Lilydale cemetery. She was survived by her younger son Robert, George having died from an aneurysm on 5 November 1960. Robert Alan Vasey died on 21 September 2008.

== Awards ==
Jessie Vasey was inducted into the Victorian Honour Roll of Women in 2001.
