= Edward Milford =

Australian Army officer (1894–1972)

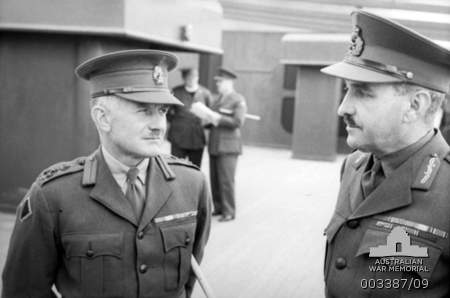
- Brigadier Milford (left) and Major General Lavarack, commander of the 7th Division, on a troopship traveling to the Middle East, October 1940.
- Born: 10 December 1894; Prahran, Victoria
- Died: 10 June 1972 (aged 77); Macleod, Victoria
- Military career
- Allegiance: Australia
- Branch: Australian Army
- Service years: 1915–1948
- Rank: Major General
- Service number: VX12014
- Commands: Deputy Chief of the General Staff (1946); 7th Division (1944–46); 5th Division (1942–43); 11th Battery, 4th Field Artillery Brigade (1918)
- Conflicts: First World War; Western Front; Second World War; Home Front; New Guinea campaign; Borneo campaign
- Awards: Companion of the Order of the Bath; Commander of the Order of the British Empire; Distinguished Service Order; Mentioned in Despatches (3)

Major General Edward James Milford CB, CBE, DSO (10 December 1894 – 10 June 1972) was an Australian Army officer who fought in the First and the Second World Wars.

Born in Melbourne, Milford graduated from the Royal Military College in 1915. Commissioned as a lieutenant in the Australian Imperial Force, he served with the Field Artillery of the 2nd Division for most of the First World War. During his service in the military for the interwar period, he held a number of postings in ordnance and artillery in Australia and England. During the early years of the Second World War, he served as master-general of the ordnance. He later commanded the 5th and 7th Divisions during the New Guinea and Borneo campaigns. He accepted the surrender of Japanese forces in Dutch Borneo on 8 September 1945. He retired from the army in 1948, due to an illness which was later found to be a misdiagnosis, and died in 1972 at the age of 77.

== Early life ==
Edward James Milford was born to English immigrants James E. Milford on 10 December 1894 in Melbourne. He attended Wesley College and then in 1913, encouraged by his headmaster, entered the Royal Military College at Duntroon.

== Military career ==
=== First World War ===
Following graduation from Duntroon in 1915, Milford was commissioned as a lieutenant in the First Australian Imperial Force (First AIF), raised for service in the First World War, and was assigned to the 4th Field Artillery Brigade, 2nd Division. Serving initially in the Middle East, he was posted to the Western Front in March 1916. He held regimental and staff positions until being wounded in September 1917, by which time he had been promoted to major. His wounds were such that he was evacuated to England for treatment. Upon recovery, he returned to the 4th Field Artillery Brigade. In command of the 11th Battery from February 1918, he was recommended for, and awarded, the Distinguished Service Order as well as a mention in despatches for his efforts in controlling artillery support during operations on the Somme and the Battle of Amiens.

=== Interwar period ===
Milford opted to undertake training in ordnance in England after the war, and on 13 November 1919 married Wynne Rae Gray. He held a number of ordnance-related postings in both England and Australia, and attended the British Army Staff College at Camberley. He served for a time as chairman of the Resource Committee dedicated to "hardware, general stores and clothing" (there were seven such committees, each dedicated to a specific area of defence resources), which reported to the Defence Resources Board. At the time of the outbreak of the Second World War, he was director of artillery at Army headquarters in Melbourne, where he had been posted for four years.

=== Second World War ===
In March 1940, Milford was assigned to the newly formed 7th Division as commander of the division's artillery, one of a number of officers from the Staff Corps appointed to the division. He traveled to the Middle East in October but was destined to spend only a few weeks in his position before being recalled to Australia in January 1941 to take up the post of master-general of the ordnance. He was also promoted to temporary major general, the first Duntroon graduate to reach the rank of general. In his new appointment, he was tasked with co-ordination of private and government manufacturers and producers to provide logistic support for Australia's soldiers, both at home and overseas. He was also involved with a committee investigating the supply requirements of each of the services and the available resources, as well as the development of new weapons. When the Owen gun, an Australian designed and manufactured submachine gun, was brought to his attention, he initially favoured the use of the Sten, even though it proved to be less reliable than the Owen.

==== New Guinea campaign ====
In 1942, Milford was commander of the 5th Division, then based in Queensland and intended for operations against the Japanese Empire. He landed with elements of his division at Milne Bay on the eastern tip of New Guinea on 14 January 1943 and began operations on nearby Goodenough Island. The island had recently been captured from the Japanese but only a small Australian garrison was present to guard against any attempt by the enemy to take it back. Dummy buildings and fortifications were built to give the Japanese the impression that the Australian presence on Goodenough was greater than it actually was, and may have deterred them from attempting to retake the island. By April the Japanese threat to Goodenough had receded and an air strip was under construction.

In late August 1943, the 5th Division moved to the Morobe Province of New Guinea to replace the 3rd Division, which was then participating in the Salamaua–Lae campaign. Milford was tasked with continuing offensive operations against the Japanese around Salamaua to divert resources away from the nearby Japanese base in the town of Lae. Once the neighbouring 9th Division commenced their attack to capture Lae on 4 September by landing east of the town to begin an encircling movement, the 5th Division moved to take Salamaua, which eventually fell to the Australians on 11 September.

Salamaua was intended to become a large base for the Allied forces in the region, but when Lieutenant General Edmund Herring inspected the area immediately following its capture it was deemed not suitable. Instead, Herring directed Milford to establish the base at newly captured Lae. Milford supervised the construction of roads and supply depots of the "Lae Fortress" until 3 November, when he was made general staff officer of the New Guinea Force (NGF). For his leadership and service in Lae and with the NGF, he was appointed a Commander of the Order of the British Empire.

==== Borneo campaign ====
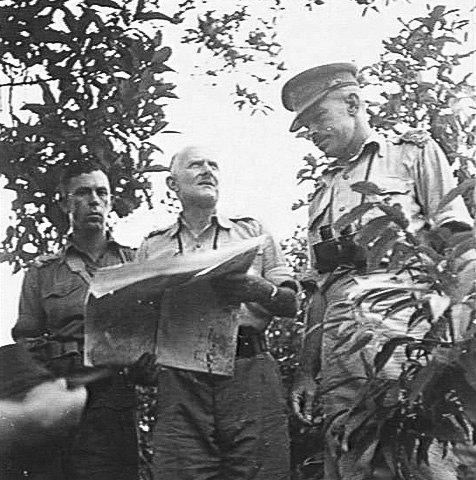
Milford (centre) inspecting Japanese strong point with the commander of the 25th Infantry Brigade, Brigadier Kenneth Eather (right), during Operation Oboe Two, 4 July 1945

In July 1944, he succeeded his friend (and fellow Duntroon classmate) Major General George Vasey as commander of the 7th Division. The division had been resting and refitting in Australia since its withdrawal in early 1944 from New Guinea following the Ramu Valley campaign, which had been conducted in the aftermath of the capture of Lae.

In early 1945, planning was underway for Operation Oboe Two, an amphibious assault to capture Balikpapan, a seaport on Borneo. The 9th Division was originally designated for the operation, but in April it was decided to utilise the 7th Division instead, and it duly embarked from Cairns to Morotai, the staging post for the assault. Operation Oboe Two would transpire to be the largest amphibious operation mounted by the Australian military. Despite opposition from the American naval commanders providing support for the operation, Milford decided to land his forces at Klandasan, a southern suburb of Balikpapan which although heavily defended, had suitable beaches for landing troops. By landing at Klandasan, Milford hoped to achieve tactical surprise and anticipated fire support from the United States Navy would help counter the coastal defences of the Japanese. The battle of Balikpapan began on 1 July with a naval barrage of the landing area, supported by bombers of the Royal Australian Air Force, with the division landing relatively unopposed by mid morning. By 1pm, the beachhead was secure and Milford, together with Generals Douglas MacArthur and Leslie Morshead made an inspection of the area. At this late stage of the war it was clear that the war would soon end, and extensive use was made of divisional artillery (which Milford had raised during his earlier spell with the division in 1940) rather than needlessly risk soldiers' lives. By 21 July, Balikpapan was secure and the Japanese were retreating into Borneo. Milford ordered a halt to further offensive action and instructed his outlying forces to hold their position, thus concluding a successful operation.

The war was now rapidly drawing to a close and upon the surrender of the Japanese Empire in August, Milford was ordered to accept the surrender of the representative commander of the Japanese forces, which numbered around 8,500 troops, in Dutch-Borneo. On 8 September, Milford observed the surrender of the Japanese military governor of the area, Vice Admiral Michiaki Kamada, in a ceremony held aboard HMAS Burdekin which was anchored off the coast of Dutch Borneo.

== Later life ==
Milford remained the commander of the 7th Division, as well as the Morotai occupation force, until March 1946. He returned to Melbourne, replacing Major General John Chapman as Deputy Chief of General Staff on 11 March. An appointment as adjutant general followed in May. He retired on 23 April 1948 due to ill health but this was due to an incorrect diagnosis of prostate cancer. In 1946, he had been recommended for appointment as a Companion of the Order of the Bath for his leadership during Operation Oboe Two, and was duly presented with the Order in 1949.

Milford died in Macleod, Melbourne on 10 June 1972, and was survived by his son (a 1944 graduate of the Royal Military College at Duntroon).

== Notes ==
Military offices
Preceded by Major General John Chapman	Deputy Chief of the General Staff; 1946	Succeeded by Major General Henry Wells
Preceded by Major General George Vasey	General Officer Commanding 7th Division; 1944–1946	Formation disbanded
Preceded by Major General James Durrant	General Officer Commanding 5th Division; 1942–1944	Succeeded by Major General Alan Ramsay
