= Leslie Beavis =

Australian military officer (1895–1975)

Leslie Ellis Beavis
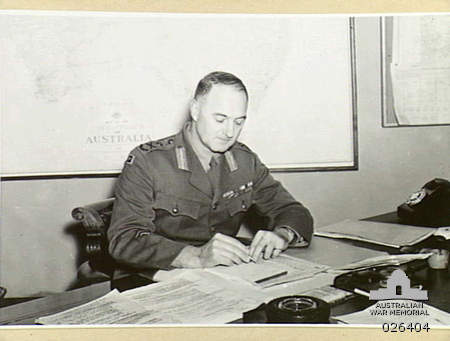
- Major General Leslie Beavis, August 1942
- Born: 25 January 1895; Bathurst, New South Wales
- Died: 27 September 1975 (aged 80); Heidelberg, Victoria
- Military career
- Allegiance: Australia
- Branch: Australian Army
- Service years: 1913–1952
- Rank: Major General
- Service number: VX12396
- Commands: 53rd Battery, 14th Field Artillery Brigade (1917–18); 12th Battery, 4th Field Artillery Brigade (1916)
- Conflicts: First World War; Sinai and Palestine campaign; Western Front; Second World War; North African campaign; Home Front
- Awards: Companion of the Order of the Bath; Commander of the Order of the British Empire; Distinguished Service Order; Mentioned in Despatches (2)
- Other work: Australian High Commissioner to Pakistan (1952–54)

Major General Leslie Ellis Beavis, CB, CBE, DSO (25 January 1895 – 27 September 1975) was a soldier in the Australian Army, who served in the First World War and was a general during the Second World War. He later served as Australian High Commissioner to Pakistan.

== Early life ==
Beavis was born in Bathurst, New South Wales, on 25 January 1895. He was the son of Horace Colin Dean Beavis, a photographer, and his wife Emma Weston née Bailey. He received his education at Bathurst District School and in March 1913 he entered the Royal Military College in Duntroon.

== Military career ==
=== First World War ===
Following the outbreak of the First World War in August 1914, Beavis' course at the College was shortened and he graduated in June 1915, top of his class. He was commissioned a lieutenant in the Australian Imperial Force (AIF). Assigned to the 5th Field Artillery Brigade, he shipped to the Middle East in November, serving in Egypt during the Sinai and Palestine campaign before being transferred to the Western Front in April 1916.

Initially serving in 4th Field Artillery Brigade, Beavis was promoted to captain in July. In 1917, he attended staff training in England and 2nd Division headquarters before being transferred to 14th Field Artillery Brigade as commander of 53rd Battery. Promoted to major at the time of taking his command, his unit suffered gas attacks in fighting near Ypres but his leadership skills ensured his post remained in Australian hands. The effects of the gas on his health saw him evacuated to England in November. For his actions, he was recommended for the Distinguished Service Order, which was duly gazetted on 14 June 1918.

Beavis subsequently returned to his unit and on 21 April 1918, men of his unit were involved in the shooting down of Manfred von Richthofen, the Red Baron. The action was witnessed by Beavis, and in the ensuing investigation as to who shot down the German ace, Beavis placed credit for the kill with his Lewis gunners. He was mentioned in despatches for the second time (the first was in 1917) on 28 May 1918.

=== Interwar period ===
Following the conclusion of the war, Beavis remained in England to undertake ordnance and artillery training and in August 1919, married Ethel May Blumer. Following a period of time at Australian High Commission in London, he and his wife returned to Australia in 1922 where he served in a number of staff and regimental positions. In 1928, he once again went to England to attend the Staff College at Camberley. Following his studies, he spent time on the Imperial General Staff, and then was subsequently posted for a second stint in London with the Australian High Commission.

In 1936, Beavis was made chairman of the Defence Resources Board which was charged with providing the Australian government with advice on the mobilisation of the Australian industry for war. He repeatedly recommended encouraging development of the private sector in manufacturing prior to the outbreak of hostilities (at the time expected to occur in the Far East by 1939). However, a counterargument that available funds should be prioritised for government factories found greater favour. Following the disbandment of the Defence Resources Board in April 1937, Beavis returned to his regular army duties.

=== Second World War ===
Beavis was promoted to colonel within weeks of the commencement of the Second World War and joined the Second Australian Imperial Force (AIF) in 1940. He served in the Middle East on the staff of Lieutenant General Sir Thomas Blamey, the commander of the AIF, holding a number of supply related positions. Promoted to the temporary rank of brigadier in December 1940, he was successful in a new role of director of ordnance services. This led to his appointment as a Commander of the Order of the British Empire in 1942. Promoted to temporary major general in April 1942, he returned to Australia to succeed Major General Edward Milford in the position of master-general of the ordnance. He was tasked with co-ordination of private and government manufacturers and producers to provide logistic support for Australia's soldiers, both at home and overseas. As the war came to a close, he found his work becoming more difficult as Australia began to move away from a wartime footing.

== Later life ==
After the war, Beavis worked in weapon and equipment development on behalf of the Department of Defence. On 1 January 1952, his rank of major general was made permanent and he was made a Companion of the Order of the Bath. Within a month he retired from the Australian Army. He served as the Australian High Commissioner to Pakistan from 1952 to 1954. From 1954 until 1960, he was honorary colonel of the Royal Australian Army Ordnance Corps. He died at the age of 80 on 27 September 1975 in a hospital in Heidelberg, a suburb of Melbourne. Honoured by a military funeral after which his remains were cremated, he was survived by a son and daughter.

== Notes ==
Diplomatic posts
| Preceded by John Oldham | Australian High Commissioner to Pakistan; 1952–1954 | Succeeded by Walter Cawthorn |
