= Australian Staff Corps =

- Active: 1920–83
- Country: Australia
- Branch: Army
- Type: Corps
- Role: Administration and Training

The Australian Staff Corps was a small corps of Regular Army officers who were trained in staff duties and who were largely responsible for the training of the Militia, Australia’s part-time military force, during the inter-war period and in the early years following the Second World War. Members of the corps were largely graduates of the Royal Military College, Duntroon.

== History ==
The corps was established on 1 October 1920, in the aftermath of the First World War following the demobilisation of the Australian Imperial Force, when Australia's part-time military forces were reorganised to re-assume the main responsibility for the nation's defences. As part of the reorganisation, it was decided to raise a force of two cavalry divisions and five infantry divisions with various supporting arms to be maintained through a mixture of voluntary and compulsory service. To oversee the training and planning for this force, the Australian Staff Corps was established, along with the Australian Instructional Corps (AIC); together these two corps replaced the previously existing Administrative and Instructional Staff (A & I Staff), which had been responsible for the organisation of the Australian Military Forces since the Federation of Australia in 1901. These personnel were posted to Militia units as part of a small Regular training and administration cadre.

The corps' personnel consisted of all officers, except quartermasters (who belonged to the AIC), holding substantive commissions within the Permanent Military Force assigned to the previously existing A & I Staff, the Royal Australian Artillery, the Royal Australian Engineers or the Australian Army Service Corps.

In the post Second World War period, the strategic imperatives of the Cold War resulted in the Regular Army taking primacy over part-time forces, and the training of part-time soldiers moved towards a more centralised scheme. The raising of regular combat units, including infantry, with corps-specific training schools, negated the need for corps such as the AIC, or the Australian Staff Corps. Amidst these and other changes the Australian Staff Corps was finally removed from the Order of Precedence in 1983. (Note: The corps was removed from the order of precedence listed in Regulation No. 68 of the Australian Military Regulations 1927 as amended by Statutory Rules 1983 No. 61 dated 17 May 1983.)
