= 11th Division (Australia) =

1942–46 Australian Army formation

- Active: 1942–1946
- Country: Australia
- Branch: Army
- Type: Infantry
- Part of: New Guinea Force; I Corps; II Corps
- Engagements: World War II: New Guinea campaign; New Britain campaign

Insignia
- Unit colour patch

The 11th Division was an Australian Army unit formed during World War II by the renaming of Milne Force in December 1942. Predominately a Militia formation, the division's main role during the war was as a base command headquarters, although elements saw action in New Guinea against Japanese forces during the Finisterre Range campaign and in New Britain. It was disbanded in July 1946.

== History ==
In July 1942, a headquarters was raised to command the units that had been sent to Milne Bay, to establish a series of airfields there after the Battle of the Coral Sea. The majority of the staff for this headquarters came from the 1st Division, and at the time of its establishment it was called "C Force" and became Milne Force in August 1942. Only a limited number of troops were assigned, with the first elements being two companies of Militia troops from the 55th Battalion, bolstered later by the arrival of the 7th Infantry Brigade and then the 18th Infantry Brigade, a veteran Second Australian Imperial Force unit. Throughout late August and early September, the Japanese attempted to land troops to capture the airfields and in the Battle of Milne Bay were defeated by the defending Milne Force elements. In October, the 17th Infantry Brigade arrived to relieved the 18th, which was despatched to Buna in December 1942.

It was decided that the formation would assume a more active role and in December 1942, Milne Force was renamed the 11th Division. Upon establishment, the division was commanded by Major-General Cyril Clowes. It remained around Milne Bay until January 1943, when the 5th Division arrived to relieve it and the division was transferred to Port Moresby. At Moresby, the 11th Division headquarters relieved the 6th Division staff and took the base units, including the 7th Brigade, under command. A further move occurred in July 1943, when the divisional headquarters was flown to Dobodura, assuming responsibility for the area between Oro Bay and Buna from the US 41st Infantry Division. The division commanded the 6th and 29th Infantry Brigades, both Militia formations. The 29th was transferred to the 3rd Division in August to take part in the fighting around Salamaua.

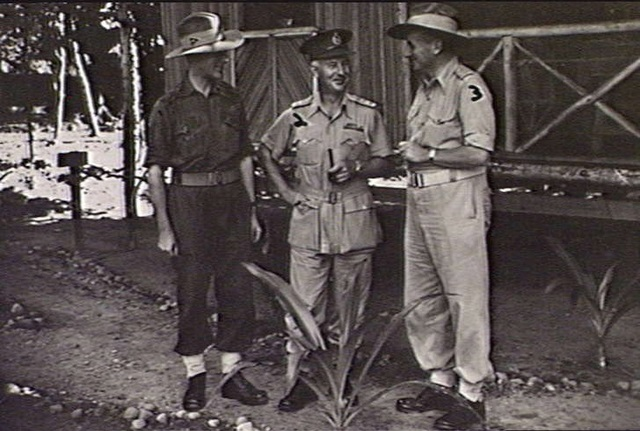
Commander of the 11th Division, Major-General Allan Boase, with staff officers at Dobodura, October 1943

In September 1943, Major-General Allan Boase took command of the division. The following month division came under the control of II Corps having previously been assigned to I Corps (and before that New Guinea Force). The divisional headquarters moved to Lae in February 1944, relieving the 5th Division, which was transferred to Finschhafen to relieve the 9th Division. At Lae, the division resumed the base command with the 29th Brigade as its only fighting formation.

In April 1944, the corps' headquarters moved to Dumpu and it later relieved the 7th Division, which had been fighting a campaign through the Markham and Ramu Valleys and into the Finisterre Ranges. Assuming control of the 15th and 18th Infantry Brigades, the division continued the advance towards Madang, linking with the 5th Division around Bogadjim, before being moved back to Wau in early May 1944, leaving its divisional carrier company at Dumpu and transferring several units to the 5th Division. Headquarters returned to Lae in this time, although the 6th Infantry Brigade was pushed forward to Bulolo in June 1944.

Following this, the divisional headquarters was relieved by the 3rd Division in July 1944 and returned to Australia, later to be reconstituted on the Atherton Tablelands around Kairi, in Queensland. In August, the division moved to Mapee. The 11th became one of six Australian divisions converted to the Jungle division establishment. The division later fought a brief campaign on New Britain in the last year of the war, landing at Jacquinot Bay and taking over from the 5th Division in July 1945. On New Britain, the division assumed command of the 4th and 13th Infantry Brigades. These formations pushed towards Wide Bay and Open Bay, as the Australians sought to contain the much larger Japanese garrison on the Gazelle Peninsula, rather than carry out a direct assault on the main Japanese position at Rabaul. In August, the war came to an end and the 11th Division entered Rabaul and oversaw the surrender of the Japanese garrison.

Division headquarters remained in Rabaul until late April 1946 during which its constituent units and elements of its staff were repatriated to Australia in individual drafts. On 25 April 1946, its remaining cadre of 20 personnel embarked on SS Ormiston, bound for Sydney. The disbandment of the 11th Division was completed by 1 July 1946, when the last personnel marched out for demobilisation. Some personnel from the division later served in the 67th Infantry Battalion, undertaking occupation duties as part of the British Commonwealth Occupation Force in Japan.

== Divisional units ==
The following units were assigned to the 11th Division during the war:

- 7th Infantry Brigade (October 1942 – January 1943, February–July 1943 & July–August 1944)
- 18th Infantry Brigade (October 1942 – December 1942 & April–May 1944)
- 14th Infantry Brigade (February–March 1943)
- 15th Infantry Brigade (February–May 1943 & April 1944)
- 30th Infantry Brigade (February–March 1943)
- 6th Infantry Brigade (July 1943 – April 1944)
- 29th Infantry Brigade (July–April 1943 & March–September 1944)
- 4th Infantry Brigade (June–August 1945)
- 13th Infantry Brigade (June–August 1945)
- 2/6th Armoured Regiment (January–April 1943)
- 2/1st Pioneer Battalion (February 1943)
- 2/8th Armoured Regiment (April–July 1943)
- 15th Battalion (July–August 1943)
- 1st New Guinea Infantry Battalion (June–August 1945)
- 158th Infantry Regiment (United States Army) (February–April 1943)

== Commanding officers ==
The following officers commanded the 11th Division:

- Major-General Cyril Clowes
- Brigadier Murray Moten
- Major-General Arthur Allen
- Major-General Allan Boase
- Major-General Alan Ramsay
- Major-General Kenneth Eather

== See also ==
- List of Australian divisions in World War II
