= Battle of Madang =

Part of New Guinea campaign of World War II

- Part of World War II, Pacific War
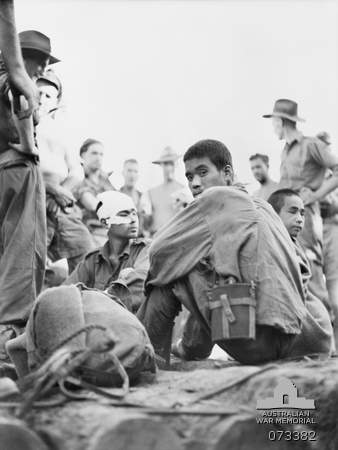
- Japanese prisoners of war at Madang, May 1944
Date	February – April 1944
Location	Madang, Territory of New Guinea 5°13′S 145°48′E
Result	Allied victory

Belligerents
Australia; United States	Japan

Commanders and leaders
(Australia) George Vasey (Australia) Allan Boase	(Empire of Japan) Hatazō Adachi

Units involved
5th Division; 7th Division; 11th Division; 32nd Infantry Division	18th Army

The Battle of Madang, fought between early February and late April 1944, was the break-out and pursuit phase of the Markham and Ramu Valley – Finisterre Range and Huon Peninsula campaigns, which were part of the wider New Guinea campaign of World War II. After overcoming the Japanese defences around Shaggy Ridge, the Australian forces descended the steep slopes of the Finisterre Range and pursued the withdrawing Japanese towards Bogadjim and then Madang on the north coast of New Guinea. There they linked up with US and Australian forces that had advanced along the coast from the Huon Peninsula, while the remnants of three Japanese divisions withdrew towards Wewak, where further fighting would take place throughout late 1944 and into 1945.

== Background ==
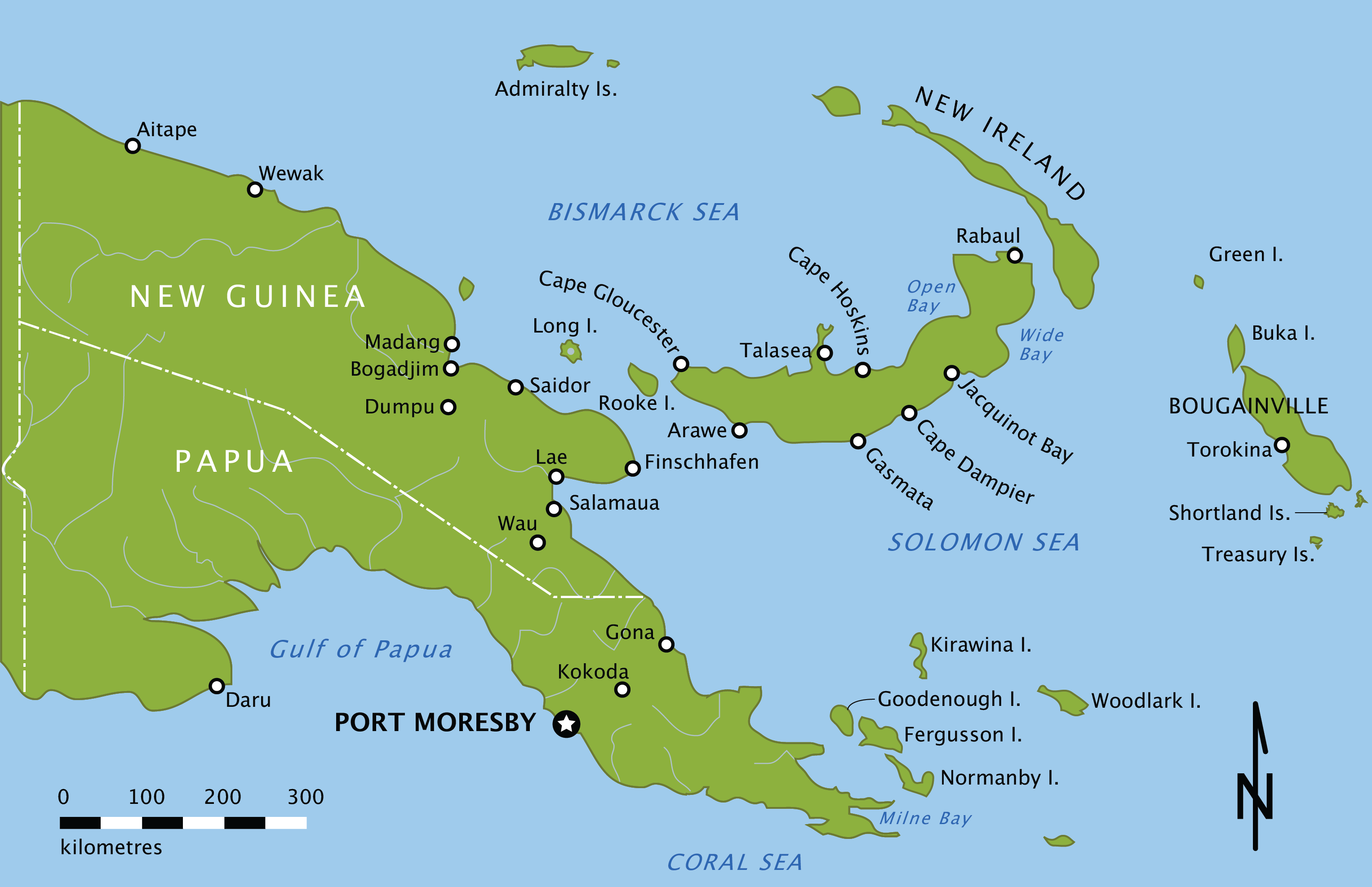
Area map of New Guinea and surrounds

=== Geography ===
Situated on the north-eastern coast of Papua New Guinea on the Schering Peninsula, which juts out into the northern part of Astrolabe Bay, Madang offers a protected deep-water port open to communication through the Vitiaz Strait and the Bismarck Sea. Established as the capital of German New Guinea prior to World War I, during the German administration of the area, the town of Madang had been known as Friedrich-Wilhelmshafen. Following the war, the area had been placed under Australian administration in 1920 and had subsequently been renamed. The pre-war population of the area was estimated at around 25,000 to 30,000 indigenous inhabitants within the greater Madang area, with under 100 Asians and around 200 Europeans. The European population was largely evacuated from the town in late 1941 and early 1942.

The harbour is landlocked and set in a lagoon that runs between Cape Barschtsch and the Schering Peninsula. Seawards, it is protected by Kranket Island. Bounded by the Adelbert Range to the east and Cape Barschtsch to the north, the town sits on a flat coastal strip that consists of some swampy areas, plantations and grassed areas. Further inland, the vegetation grows more dense, although at the time of the battle it was passable, particularly on foot. The terrain is less rugged than the Finisterre Range to the south and there are no especially high features, although it is more difficult north of the Gogol River, which flows into Astrolabe Bay about halfway along the coast between Bogadjim and Madang. This river, along with several others including the Gori and Palpa, form significant obstacles along the southern approaches to the town.

=== Strategic situation ===
Madang was captured by the Japanese in early March 1942, along with Lae and Salamaua as part of operations to establish a key base at Rabaul. After this, the Japanese had worked to improve various means of communication around the area including roads, port facilities and airfields to utilise Madang's deep-water harbour as part of a forward base, which was established around Madang and Alexishafen, 8.25 miles (13.28 km) north, to support forces in the Salamaua–Lae area. In 1943–1944, Australian and US forces began offensive actions in New Guinea, having stemmed the tide of the Japanese advance during the fighting in 1942. In September 1943, the Allies had secured Lae and Nadzab. Shortly afterwards, the 9th Division had landed on the Huon Peninsula and had subsequently secured Finschhafen and began clearing inland. By October 1943, the next objective for the Australians was Shaggy Ridge, a series of high positions on the inland route from Dumpu to Madang, which was held by Japanese infantry, supported by artillery and engineers.

After the defeat of the Japanese in the Battle of Shaggy Ridge in late January 1944, the remnants of the Japanese 78th Infantry Regiment, assigned to Lieutenant General Shigeru Katagiri's 20th Division, part of Lieutenant General Hatazō Adachi's 18th Army, began a withdrawal from the Finisterre Range and was tasked with reorganising itself around Madang and carrying out delaying actions. Around the same time, Hidemitsu Nakano's 51st Division, began withdrawing west along the coast from the Finschaffen area, undertaking a difficult march to bypass Saidor following the landing there by US troops. These moves were part of a general withdrawal that would see the Japanese move beyond the Sepik River towards Aitape and Wewak, with one division ultimately being sent to Hollandia.

The withdrawal of Japanese troops towards Madang enabled the Australian Army forces to break through the Japanese positions in the Finisterre Mountains, which had been holding up their drive north. After a brief pause to bring up supplies, and to rotate troops as the Australian 11th Division under Major General Allan Boase replaced George Vasey's 7th Division, the Australians slowly advanced down the rugged, densely forested slopes of the Finisterres, pursuing the withdrawing Japanese towards Bogadjim on the northern coast, about 20 miles (32 km) away.

For the advance, two infantry battalions from the Australian 15th Infantry Brigade – the 57th/60th and 58th/59th – were given the task of pushing forward from Kankiryo towards Madang via the Mindjim River, Astrolabe Bay and Bogadjim. The brigade's third infantry battalion, the 24th, was held back in reserve maintaining a defensive posture around Shaggy Ridge, while also pushing forward on the Australians' western flank along the Ramu River towards Kesawai and Koropa. At the same time, US troops would advance east from their base around Saidor about 40 miles (64 km). In the final stages of the battle, Australian troops from the 8th Infantry Brigade would be moved up the coast by sea from Saidor.

== Battle ==
In the early stages of the pursuit, the Australians sent long-range patrols forward from the Finisterres, while two battalions from the US 32nd Infantry Division landed around the Yalau Plantation as US forces advanced east from Saidor. They began patrolling operations around the coast to the east and west, fighting minor skirmishes, and pushed towards Bau Plantation and Yangalum, on the eastern side of the Australian advance with the intention of linking up. Throughout February and March, the Japanese 20th Division withdrew towards Madang, fighting a series of rearguard actions against the Australians that were advancing from Kankiryo. The going was tough for the troops of the Australian 15th Infantry Brigade who advanced slowly towards Bogadjim, using aggressive patrols to advance their position forwards. The Japanese began strengthening their defences around Bogadjim at this time, constructing a series of outposts in a 5-mile (8.0 km) radius to the south of the town; nevertheless, Australian patrols were able to bypass these and penetrate towards Erima Plantation where intelligence received from locals indicated large concentrations of Japanese forces.

After taking over the western drive up the Ramu River from the 24th Infantry Battalion, the 2/2nd Commando Squadron advanced from Kesawai and then to Orgoruna, linking up with the 57th/60th Infantry Battalion around Yaula on 4 April. Advancing along a motor road that had been laid by the Japanese, the Australians moved along an axis bounded by the Nuru River and Kabenau River. The withdrawing Japanese offered stiff resistance, but continued to withdraw, allowing the Australians to link up with US forces around Rimba. Bogadjim was eventually reached on 13 April. Meanwhile, part of the 11th Division's divisional carrier company was flown into Wantoat in response to intelligence of Japanese patrols in the area. The dismounted troops fought a brief engagement with about 20 Japanese soldiers on 14 April during which four Japanese were killed and one Australian wounded. The Australians subsequently expanded their patrols towards the confluence of the Wantoat and Ikwap Rivers. Detecting a small group withdrawing to the north, they returned to Wantoat. A later patrol resulted in four Japanese being taken prisoner.

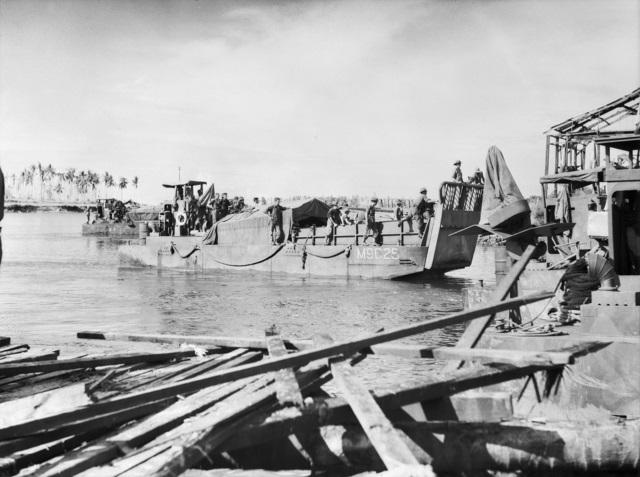
Troops from the Australian 8th Infantry Brigade land at Madang, 24 April 1944

The 57th/60th and 58th/59th Infantry Battalions continued to patrol heavily across a wide area around the Bogadjim Road, and they subsequently joined up with US troops around Sungum. The Japanese had re-orientated themselves into positions at various locations including Alibu, Rereo, Wenga, Redu and Kaliko. During this time, a number of small unit actions were undertaken as the Japanese attempted to ambush the Australians while the Australians in turn sought to infiltrate the Japanese positions. On 22 April, large amounts of Japanese supplies were found abandoned by a patrol from the 57th/60th as it became clear that the Japanese were withdrawing from the area in a hasty fashion.

At this point, the Australian command determined the need for a rotation of forces. When the commander of the 15th Infantry Brigade, Brigadier Heathcote Hammer learnt that his brigade was to be relieved by Brigadier Claude Cameron's 8th Infantry Brigade, he endeavoured to push towards Madang with all haste, in an effort to secure it before the prize went to Major General Alan Ramsay's 5th Division. On 24 April, the 57th/60th Infantry Battalion was ordered to cross the treacherous Gogol River, a fast-flowing torrent of water teeming with crocodiles. The 57th/60th attempted to outflank the Gogol River, sending a patrol to link up with two US Navy patrol boats. However, they were thwarted in their attempt to reach Madang first when troops from the 8th Infantry Brigade, operating from US landing craft, came ashore around Ort, about 6.5 kilometres (4.0 mi) south of Madang, effecting a link up between the 11th and 5th Divisions. With the help of the 532nd Engineer Boat and Shore Regiment, the 5th Division had earlier cleared the Rai Coast from Sio to Saidor, which had been secured in January – February 1944 by US forces, who were attempting to cut off the Japanese forces withdrawing from the Huon Peninsula.

Madang was subsequently taken on 24–25 April by troops from the 8th and 15th Infantry Brigades, with the 30th Infantry Battalion leading the way towards the airfield, advancing along the northern part of Astrolabe Bay to secure Madang, which offered the Allies the use of a deep-water harbour, while a platoon from the 57th/60th entered the town. Resistance in the town was almost non existent. Several artillery rounds were fired by the Japanese defenders at the advancing Australians, but the rounds landed well awry of their intended target. They were followed by a short burst of inaccurate machine-gun fire. A small group of Japanese stragglers scattered on sighting the Australian platoon. Shortly afterwards, the 8th Infantry Brigade's headquarters entered Madang Harbour aboard several landing craft, escorted by the destroyer Vendetta and the corvette Bundaberg.

The following day was Anzac Day, which saw the Australians consolidate their position around Madang. A follow-up landing was made by the 37th/52nd Infantry Battalion on Karkar Island. Meanwhile, the 35th Infantry Battalion secured a large quantity of abandoned Japanese stores at Hansa Bay, and pushed patrols towards the Sepik River. The Bundaberg also landed a party of sailors on Sek Island, firing a heavy bombardment which wiped out the small group of defending Japanese. The 30th pushed on to the deep-water port of Alexishafen the following day, suffering several casualties from improvised explosive devices that were planted along the road by the withdrawing Japanese. In addition, large quantities of Japanese supplies were also discovered.

== Aftermath ==
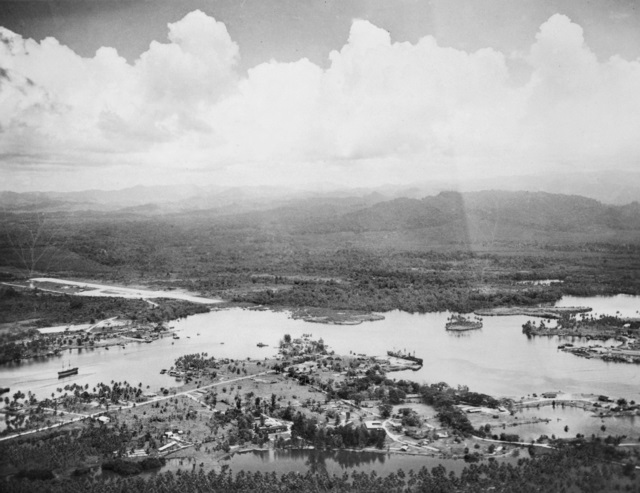
Madang harbour, October 1945

With the capture of Madang, the Allies finally effectively secured the Huon Peninsula, bringing both the Huon Peninsula and Markham Valley campaigns to a close. For the Australians, the advance through the Markham, Ramu and Faria Valleys proved to be a hard slog. Casualties for the 7th Division between 18 September 1943 and 8 April 1944 amounted to 204 killed and 464 wounded. Disease took an even greater toll with 13,576 personnel being evacuated. Despite these losses, the campaign was, in the words of historian Eustace Keogh, "an impressive performance, characterised by energy, determination and sound planning". Fought with limited resources, it nevertheless demonstrated the advances that the Australian Army had made tactically and operationally since the fighting around Kokoda and Buna–Gona in 1942 and early 1943. Japanese estimates of their own casualties indicate losses of 800 killed, 400 wounded and 800 dead from disease.

In the aftermath of the campaign the Australian 5th Division was tasked with providing a garrison force for the north-east coast of New Guinea, patrolling the area around Madang, which would be built up as a base with the intention of being able to supply 35,000 troops for subsequent operations. Meanwhile, the bulk of the Australian first line combat troops were withdrawn to Australia for rest and re-organisation. The commitment of US troops from the 32nd Division to the fighting around Saidor – coupled with the dispatch of the US 41st Division to the Salamaua campaign earlier in 1943 – represented a shift in the Allied strategy of giving the Australians autonomy of operations in New Guinea and from early 1944 until the end of the war, the US Army would assume primary responsibility for offensive operations in the Pacific.

The Japanese 18th Army was subsequently ordered to withdraw to Wewak in late March; as the 51st Division withdrew to the Wewak area, the 20th Division held Hansa Bay, and the 41st Division carried out rearguard operations around Madang throughout April. Severely depleted, in all, the three divisions only fielded about 20,000 troops. In late 1944, US troops carried out a landing at Aitape and began operations to isolate the Japanese garrison there as part of the Western New Guinea campaign, later clashing around the Driniumor River. They were subsequently relieved in late 1944 by Australian troops from the 6th Division, which launched the Aitape–Wewak campaign, fighting to secure the airfield and then clear the Japanese from the inland areas, patrolling through the Torricelli and Prince Alexander mountain ranges until the end of the war in August 1945. Meanwhile, troops from the 8th Infantry Brigade remained in the Madang area until the end of the war.

After the war, the Australian Army issued a battle honour for "Madang" to the 30th Infantry Battalion for its advance along the northern part of Astrolabe Bay and its subsequent capture of Madang. It was the only unit to receive that honour.
