= Cyril Clowes =

Australian general

Cyril Albert Clowes
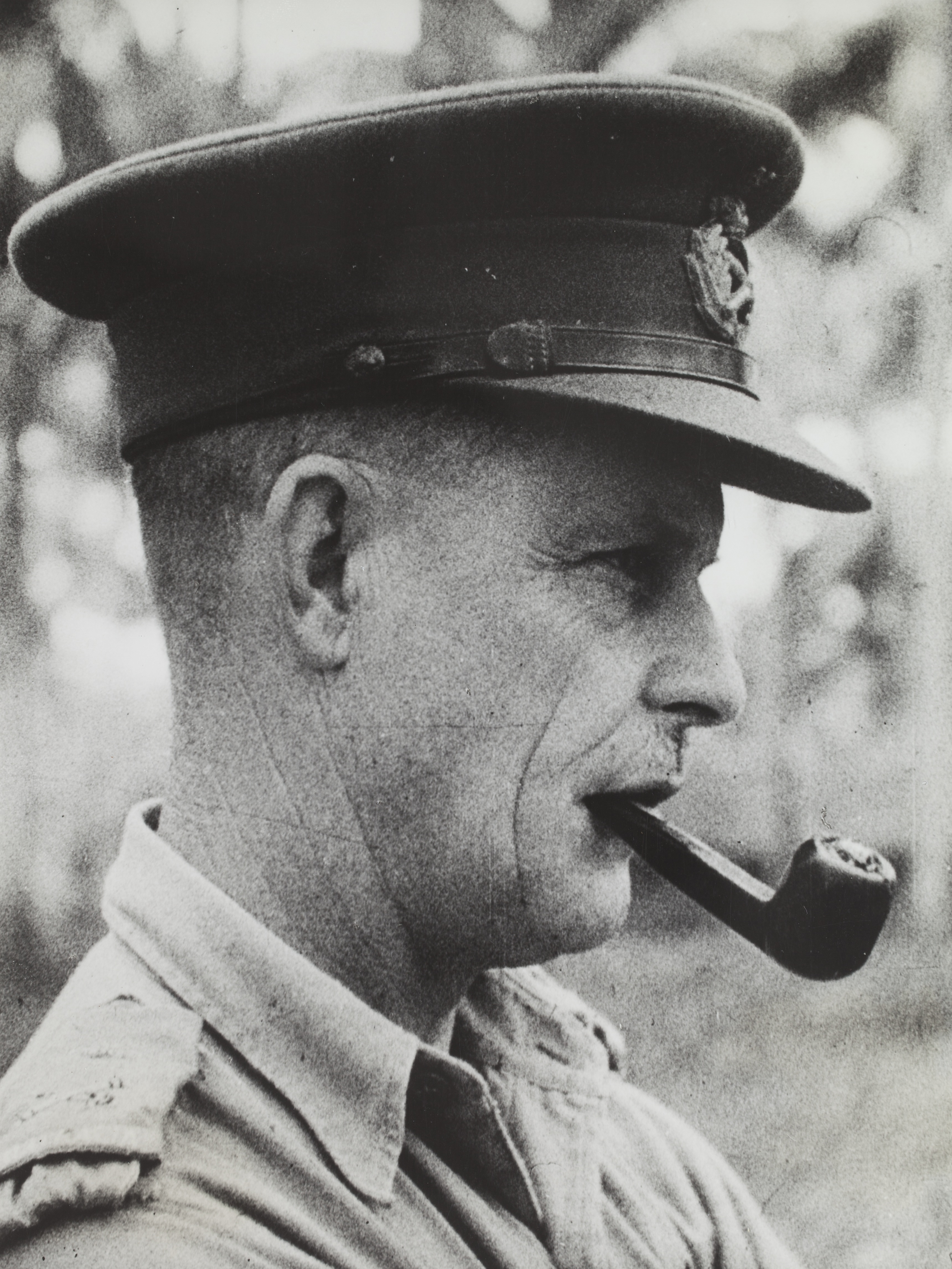
- Major General Cyril Albert Clowes at the Battle of Milne Bay, New Guinea, 1942
- Born: 11 March 1892; Warwick, Queensland
- Died: 19 May 1968 (aged 76); Melbourne, Victoria
- Military career
- Allegiance: Australia
- Branch: Australian Army
- Service years: 1911–1949
- Rank: Lieutenant General
- Nickname: "Silent Cyril"
- Service number: TX2050
- Commands: Southern Command (1946–49); Victorian Lines of Communication Area (1943–45); 11th Division (1942–43); Milne Force (1942); 1st Division (1942); Royal Australian Artillery, I Corps (1940–41); 6th Military District (1939–40)
- Conflicts: First World War; Gallipoli campaign; Landing at Anzac Cove; Western Front; Hundred Days Offensive; Second World War; Battle of Greece; New Guinea campaign; Battle of Milne Bay
- Awards: Commander of the Order of the British Empire; Distinguished Service Order; Military Cross; Mentioned in Despatches (4); Commander of the Order of the White Eagle (Serbia); War Cross (Greece)

Lieutenant General Cyril Albert Clowes, CBE, DSO, MC (11 March 1892 – 19 May 1968) was an Australian soldier. He won the first land victory against the Japanese in the Second World War, at the Battle of Milne Bay, New Guinea. Like many other senior officers involved in the Papuan campaign, he was then transferred to a less important posting by General Sir Thomas Blamey.

== Early life and First World War ==
Clowes was born at Warwick in Queensland, and entered the Royal Military College, Duntroon, in 1911.

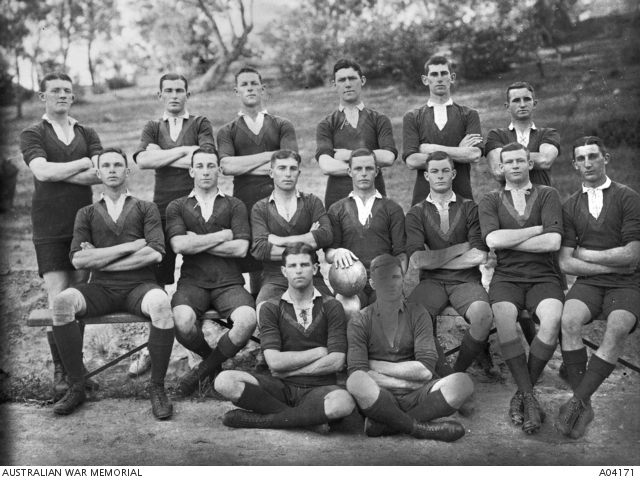
Members of the first fifteen, first grade rugby team, at the RMC, Duntroon, 1913. Cyril A. Clowes is sat in the middle row, directly in the centre.

In August 1914, shortly after the outbreak of World War I, he graduated and was appointed lieutenant in the Australian Imperial Force (AIF) with a commission in the Permanent Military Force. Posted to the 1st Field Artillery Brigade, he landed at Gallipoli on 25 April 1915, serving as a forward observation officer and directing naval gunfire against Turkish positions. He was wounded at Gallipoli. After he recuperated Clowes was promoted to captain in the 2nd Divisional Artillery in Egypt during January 1916.

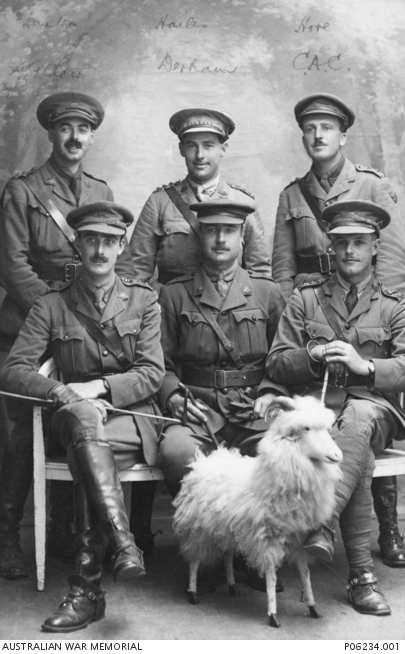
Studio portrait of Australian officers posing with a toy sheep, pictured here in either 1915 or 1916. Major Cyril Clowes is sat third on the left in the front row.

On the Western Front during 1916, Clowes served as the 2nd Division's Trench Mortar Officer and was awarded the Military Cross. He received a promotion to major in January 1917 and the following year was awarded the Distinguished Service Order for his work at Villers-Bretonneux.

He returned to Australia in April 1919, by which time the war was over due to the armistice of 11 November 1918, and left the AIF in late June.

== Inter war years ==
In 1920 Clowes took up a post as instructor at Duntroon, and remained there until 1925. That year he married Eva Magennis, and moved to Brisbane. There Clowes undertook staff, training, and command duties until 1930. He filled similar positions in Sydney and Darwin until, in 1936, he was promoted to lieutenant colonel. He went to England and completed a gunnery staff course, before returning to Australia as the Chief Instructor at Sydney's School of Artillery. In August 1939 he was given command of Australia's 6th Military District, receiving a promotion to colonel.

== Second World War ==
When the Second World War began, Clowes was made a temporary brigadier in the AIF, and in April 1940 was appointed commander of the Royal Australian Artillery, I Corps. Clowes performed very well under pressure in directing the fighting withdrawal at Pinios Gorge, Greece, in April 1941. The Germans were attempting to drive a wedge between Greek units and the allied force sent to their aid. Clowes was successful in holding the gorge against a strong German tank attack, until the situation on other parts of the front stabilised.

Although Greece fell and the campaign was a failure, Clowes' tactics minimised casualties in the withdrawal of the allied force. This battle saw the beginning of a problem that would dog Clowes' career – disputes between his superior General Sir Thomas Blamey, and Blamey's Chief of Staff, Colonel Sydney Rowell, a personal friend of Clowes. Clowes returned to Australia in January 1942, was promoted to temporary Major General, and given command of the 1st Division.

=== Milne Force ===
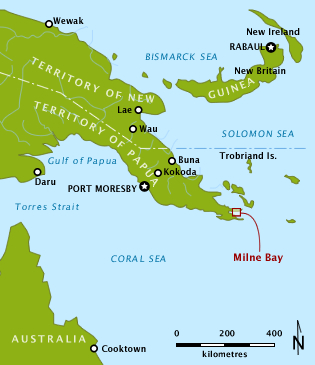
Location of Milne Bay within Territory of Papua, 1942. The highlighted area is enlarged below.

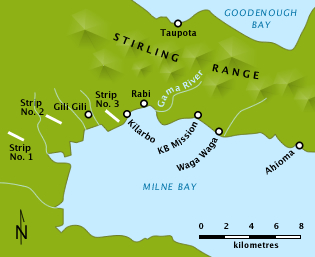
Area of the Battle of Milne Bay, indicating some key locations.

In May 1942 General Douglas MacArthur, Allied Commander in Chief of the South West Pacific Area (C in C SWPA), ordered the construction of an airfield at Milne Bay, at the eastern tip of New Guinea. His intention was to use this and other new airfields to attempt the reconquest of Rabaul, taken by the Japanese early in the war. However the airfield would also be a prize for the Japanese to attack. Once taken it could be a base for bombing sorties over the cities of south eastern Australia. MacArthur requested Thomas Blamey send troops to secure the construction site.

Initially a militia brigade was dispatched. As building progressed this was progressively reinforced with regular troops. Once buildup was complete, the garrison assumed the name Milne Force, and Clowes, now promoted to Major General, was given command. He reached Milne Bay and assumed command of the Australian troops there just four days before the Japanese began landing, beginning the Battle of Milne Bay.

=== Battle of Milne Bay ===
The Japanese made their initial landing on 25 August 1942 under Commander Yoshihide Hayashi. By dawn of 26 August, the Japanese had reached KB Mission. A counterattack by the 61st Militia Battalion drove the Japanese from KB Mission, however after six hours of intense fighting, the militia withdrew to the Gama River. Clowes ordered the Australian 2/10th Infantry Battalion to the Gama River, where they attacked. The Japanese troops and the supporting tanks inflicted severe casualties on the 2/10th, which was forced to retreat to north of No. 3 Strip (under construction), on 27 August. The 25th Battalion held the Japanese back and a two-day lull followed.

On 29 August 768 Japanese marine reinforcements were landed with Commander Minoru Yano, who took over from Hayashi. On 31 August at 3:00am, three banzai charges were repelled at No. 3 Strip with withering machine gun and mortar fire from Milne Force. The Australians launched a counter offensive at 9:00am on 31 August, and pushed the Japanese along the north coast of Milne Bay. By 4 September Japanese resistance was suicidal in intensity.

On 5 September, the Japanese high command ordered a withdrawal. On 6 September the offensive reached the main camp of the Japanese landing force. That night most Japanese survivors were evacuated. Some, trying to reach the Japanese beachhead at Buna through the mountains, were intercepted and routed.

=== Difficulties at Milne Bay ===
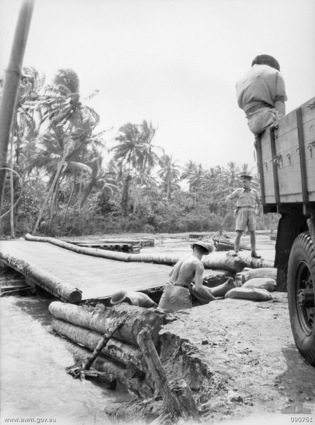
Two Royal Australian Engineers with Clowes, Milne Bay, 21 September 1942

Milne Bay is a very high rainfall area, and the all-pervading mud made transport a constant problem for Clowes. He had no barges or four-wheel drive vehicles for moving troops around. Milne Force included the highly trained 18th Infantry Brigade of the Australian 7th Division, but also the inexperienced and poorly-equipped 7th Militia Brigade. Of the total force of 8,824, only about 4,500 were infantry.

Several times during the battle, urgent signals arrived from MacArthur and Blamey, warning of imminent Japanese reinforcements, and urging him to pursue and exterminate the enemy landing force immediately. However, Clowes' original orders confirmed that his priority was holding the completed airstrip at Gili Gili. He maintained a defensive perimeter there which was never penetrated, even while taking the fight to the enemy at some distance from this base. MacArthur was responding to inaccurate intelligence. Clowes had no choice but to heed the new intelligence, and try to relocate his forces to deal with threats that in fact did not materialise.

At one point Rowell received orders from Blamey that the "landed force must be attacked with greatest vigor and destroyed as soon as possible". Rowell refused to relay this to Clowes, and instead wrote "Confident you have the situation well in hand and will administer stern punishment".

=== Relieved of command ===
MacArthur and Thomas Blamey determined that rather than being commended and rewarded for the victory, Clowes should be relieved of his command and sidelined for the duration of the war, for showing insufficient "vigour". Blamey wrote to Sydney Rowell, now Clowes' superior officer in Port Moresby:

My Dear General, I would like to congratulate you on the complete success of operations at Milne Bay … but it appeared to us here as though by not acting with great speed Clowes was liable to have missed the opportunity of dealing completely with the enemy and thus laying himself open to destruction if after securing a footing, the enemy was able to reinforce their first landing party strongly".

Blamey subsequently sacked Rowell and shortly after, Rowell's friend Clowes. Clowes returned to Australia in 1943 and held various postings until the end of the war.

== Later life ==
Clowes retired from the Army with the rank of lieutenant general in June 1949. His chief staff officer at Milne Bay, Colonel Fred Chilton, said he was

… a fine commander and a steady man. He was a cautious man … this was reflected in his dispositions [of troops]. The only thing I think he can be criticised for, is his lack of public relations – for not sending back phoney reports about what a wonderful job he was doing … his reports were confined to purely military operations and didn't give the boys back in Melbourne what they wanted. At that stage most of them didn't have a clue about fighting battles anyway…

He was known as "Silent" Cyril Clowes. In A Bastard of a Place: The Australians in Papua, Australian historian Peter Brune explained why;

Clowes was a man of few words to those he knew and even less to those he did not. His quiet, calm disposition merely masked a professional, highly trained and courageous officer who was at his best in a crisis.

Clowes died on 19 May 1968 at Repatriation General Hospital, Heidelberg, Melbourne.

== Notes ==
Military offices
New command	General Officer Commanding 11th Division; 1942–1943	Succeeded by Major General Allan Boase
Preceded by Major General Albert Fewtrell	General Officer Commanding 1st Division; 1942	Succeeded by Major General Francis Derham
