= Alan Ramsay =

Australian Army officer (1895–1973)

Sir Alan Hollick Ramsay
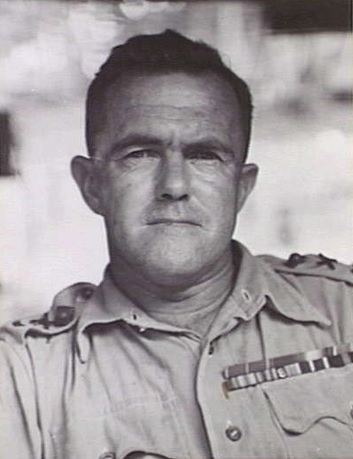
- Major General Alan Ramsay in New Britain, December 1944
- Born: 12 March 1895; Windsor, Victoria
- Died: 19 September 1973 (aged 78); Armadale, Victoria
- Military career
- Allegiance: Australia
- Branch: Australian Army
- Service years: 1915–1946
- Rank: Major General
- Service number: VX 27
- Commands: 11th Division (1945); 5th Division (1944–45); Royal Artillery, II Corps (1943–44); 9th Divisional Artillery (1940–43); Medium Artillery, I Corps (1940); 2/2nd Field Regiment (1939–40); 4th Divisional Artillery (1939); 2nd Medium Artillery Brigade (1938–39); 10th Field Artillery Brigade (1930–36)
- Conflicts: First World War; Sinai and Palestine Campaign; Western Front; Second World War; North African campaign; Siege of Tobruk; Second Battle of El Alamein; Operation Cartwheel; New Britain campaign; Bougainville Campaign
- Awards: Knight Bachelor; Companion of the Order of the Bath; Commander of the Order of the British Empire; Distinguished Service Order; Meritorious Service Medal; Efficiency Decoration; Mentioned in Despatches (3)
- Other work: Teacher, educationist

Major General Sir Alan Hollick Ramsay, CB, CBE, DSO, ED (12 March 1895 – 19 September 1973) was an Australian educator and a senior officer in the Australian Army. Having served as an officer in the First World War, he commanded the 5th and 11th Divisions during the operations in New Britain and Bougainville respectively during the Second World War.

== Early life ==
Born on 12 March 1895 in Windsor, Victoria, a suburb of Melbourne, Ramsay was the eldest of five children. He attended Melbourne Continuation School where he participated in the cadets. Upon completion of his education, Ramsay became a probationary teacher in 1912 for the Victorian Education Department. By 1915, he was teaching at the primary school at Cowleys Creek, a small township south of Melbourne, near Timboon.

== Military career ==
=== First World War ===
Ramsay enlisted with the Australian Imperial Force (AIF) on 1 October 1915, and was deployed to the Middle East with the 4th Field Artillery Brigade. He served in Egypt until March 1916, at which time he was transferred to the Western Front. He was promoted, firstly to corporal in early 1917, and then within six months to sergeant. He ended his term with the AIF on 2 August 1919 as a lieutenant, having been awarded the Meritorious Service Medal the previous year.

=== Interwar period ===
Ramsay returned to his teaching career, firstly at Lee Street State School in Carlton, Victoria, and then later at Essendon High School and Coburg High School. At the same time, he was studying towards a Diploma of Education, having already earned a Bachelor of Science degree in 1923. In December 1924, he married Edna Mary Watson with whom he had two children. Ramsay had maintained an interest in military service, and was part of the Militia. In 1930, while still a teacher but now at University High School, Melbourne, he was appointed commander of the 10th Field Artillery Brigade (Militia).

=== Second World War ===
By the outbreak of the Second World War, Ramsay was an acting colonel commanding the 4th Divisional Artillery. On 13 October, he joined the newly formed Second Australian Imperial Force (AIF), and was placed in command of the 2/2nd Field Regiment. This involved a step down in responsibility but by October of the following year, he was a brigadier. When the division embarked to the Middle East, he was in charge of the artillery of the 9th Division. He saw action during the siege of Tobruk and, as a result of his conduct there, he was made a Commander of the Order of the British Empire. He also planned the artillery barrage that supported the 9th Division's actions on 30 October during the Second Battle of El Alamein. This required the co-ordination of 360 guns across fifteen regiments, and the outstanding success of his plan caught the attention of the artillery commander of the Eighth Army. He was awarded the Distinguished Service Order in 1943 as well as being mentioned in despatches. He was well thought of by the commander of the 9th Division, Lieutenant General Leslie Morshead, who nominated Ramsay as his successor in the event he was wounded.

Ramsay returned to Australia in February 1943 and in June was placed in command of the artillery of II Corps, which had been originally formed in 1942 for the defence of Australia and was now intended for operations in the South West Pacific Area. In January 1944, he was made a temporary major general and appointed commander of the 5th Division, which was then serving in the New Guinea campaign. He went to command the division during the New Britain campaign, an operation intended to tie down Japanese troops then largely based at Rabaul. He briefly left the division to take over the 11th Division, then on Bougainville, from Major General Allan Boase in April 1945, before returning to the 5th Division in July. He was mentioned in despatches twice during his time in command of the 5th Division, as well as being made a Companion of the Order of the Bath. He ended his term with the AIF upon the disbandment of II Corps on 26 September 1945, and was placed in the Reserve of Officers.

== Later life ==
Returning to civilian life, Ramsay was appointed principal of Melbourne High School in 1946 and remained in the position until May 1948, at which time he was made Director of Education for Victoria. Charged with re-organising the education system after years of funding neglect due to the war, Ramsay introduced a number of programmes directed towards teacher recruitment and training as well as improving the infrastructure of state schools. He retired in 1960 and was knighted the following year. Alan Hollick Ramsay died on 19 September 1973 in Armadale, Victoria.

== Notes ==
Military offices
Preceded by Major General Edward Milford	General Officer Commanding 5th Division; 1944–1945	Succeeded by Major General Horace Robertson
Preceded by Major General Allan Boase	General Officer Commanding 11th Division; April – July 1945	Succeeded by Major General Kenneth Eather
