= 30th Battalion (Australia) =

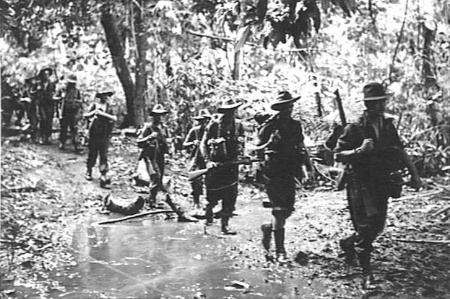
- Troops of B Company, 30th Battalion crossing a shallow creek between Weber Point and Malalamai during the Battle of Sio in 1944
- Active: 1915–1919; 1921–1930; 1935–1946; 1948–1960
- Country: Australia
- Branch: Australian Army
- Type: Infantry
- Size: ~800–1,000 men (Note: During the First World War the authorised strength of Australian infantry battalions was 1,023. During the Second World War it dropped to 803 men.)
- Part of: 8th Brigade, 5th Division
- Nickname: New South Wales Scottish Regiment
- Motto: In Omni Modo Fidelis (In All Things Faithful)
- Colours: Purple and gold
- March: Highland Laddie
- Engagements: First World War: Western Front; Second World War: Huon Peninsula campaign; Aitape–Wewak campaign

Insignia
- Unit colour patch
- Tartan: Government

The 30th Battalion was an infantry battalion of the Australian Army. It was originally formed in 1915 during the First World War as part of the all-volunteer Australian Imperial Force (AIF) and saw service on the Western Front before being disbanded in 1919. It was re-raised in 1921 but was later amalgamated with the 51st Battalion in 1930. In 1935 the two battalions were delinked and the 30th re-raised in its own right. During the Second World War it undertook garrison duties in Australia before undertaking active service in New Guinea in 1944–1945. After the war, it was disbanded in early 1946. In 1948, the battalion was re-raised again and remained on the order of battle until 1960 when it was absorbed into the Royal New South Wales Regiment.

== History ==
=== First World War ===
The 30th Battalion was originally raised for service as an Australian Imperial Force (AIF) unit during the First World War, as part of the 8th Brigade. Formed in Australia in early August 1915, the battalion concentrated at Liverpool, New South Wales and drew most of its personnel from various parts of New South Wales, with a large contingent coming from Newcastle, although one company was formed from Victorian men who had volunteered to transfer from the Royal Australian Navy to serve in the infantry. Upon the battalion's arrival in Egypt, the 8th Brigade had been unattached at divisional level, but in early 1916, it was assigned to the 5th Division, after a reorganisation that saw the AIF expanded from two infantry divisions to five. The battalion was not formed in time to see action at Gallipoli and instead they remained in Egypt until June 1916 when the battalion was transferred to the European theatre along with the rest of the 5th Division. For the next two and half years they served in the trenches along the Western Front in France and Belgium.

The battalion's first major action came at Fromelles on 19 July 1916 where they were initially tasked to provide a supporting role, carrying ammunition to the assault troops, but they were later committed to the fighting as the situation deteriorated for the Australians. After the battle, the 30th were employed in mainly defensive duties holding parts of the line for the rest of 1916. In early 1917, after the Germans withdrew to the Hindenburg Line to shorten their lines, the Australian units conducted a brief advance to follow them up, during which the 30th entered Bapaume. After this, for the remainder of the year the battalion had a relatively quiet time but nevertheless took part in two main engagements—Bullecourt and Polygon Wood—where they were employed mainly in flank protection. When the Germans launched their Spring Offensive in early 1918, the 30th found itself in reserve for the majority of the time along with the rest of the 5th Division.

Once the offensive was defeated, a brief lull followed in June and July during which the Allies sought to regain the initiative, launching a series of "Peaceful Penetration" operations; at this time, the 30th undertook a number of raids around Morlancourt before conducting an attack there on 29 July. On 8 August, they joined the Allied Hundred Days Offensive that was launched at Amiens on 8 August 1918, spearheading the 5th Division's attack up the Morcourt Valley. A series of advances followed as the Allies gained momentum, pushing their way through the Hindenburg Line defences around the Somme. The 30th's final involvement in the fighting came in late September – early October 1918 when they took part in the Battle of St. Quentin Canal, which saw a joint Australian and American force breach the Hindenburg Line. Following this, the units of the Australian Corps, which had been severely depleted during the fighting in 1918, were withdrawn from the line for rest and re-organisation at the request of the Australian prime minister, Billy Hughes. As a result, they were still out of the line when the Armistice was declared on 11 November 1918. Following this the demobilisation process began and slowly the battalion's numbers were reduced as men were repatriated back to Australia in drafts. Finally, in March 1919, the 30th Battalion was disbanded.

During the war the 30th Battalion's casualties amounted to 458 men killed and 1,207 wounded. Members of the battalion received the following gallantry and distinguished service decorations: six Distinguished Service Orders (DSOs), one Officer of the Order of the British Empire (OBE), 19 Military Crosses (MCs), 15 Distinguished Conduct Medals (DCMs); 84 Military Medals (MMs) with three Bars, four Meritorious Service Medals (MSMs); 30 Mentions in Despatches (MIDs) and four foreign awards. The battalion received a total of 16 battle honours for its involvement in the war; these were bestowed in 1927.

=== Inter-war years ===
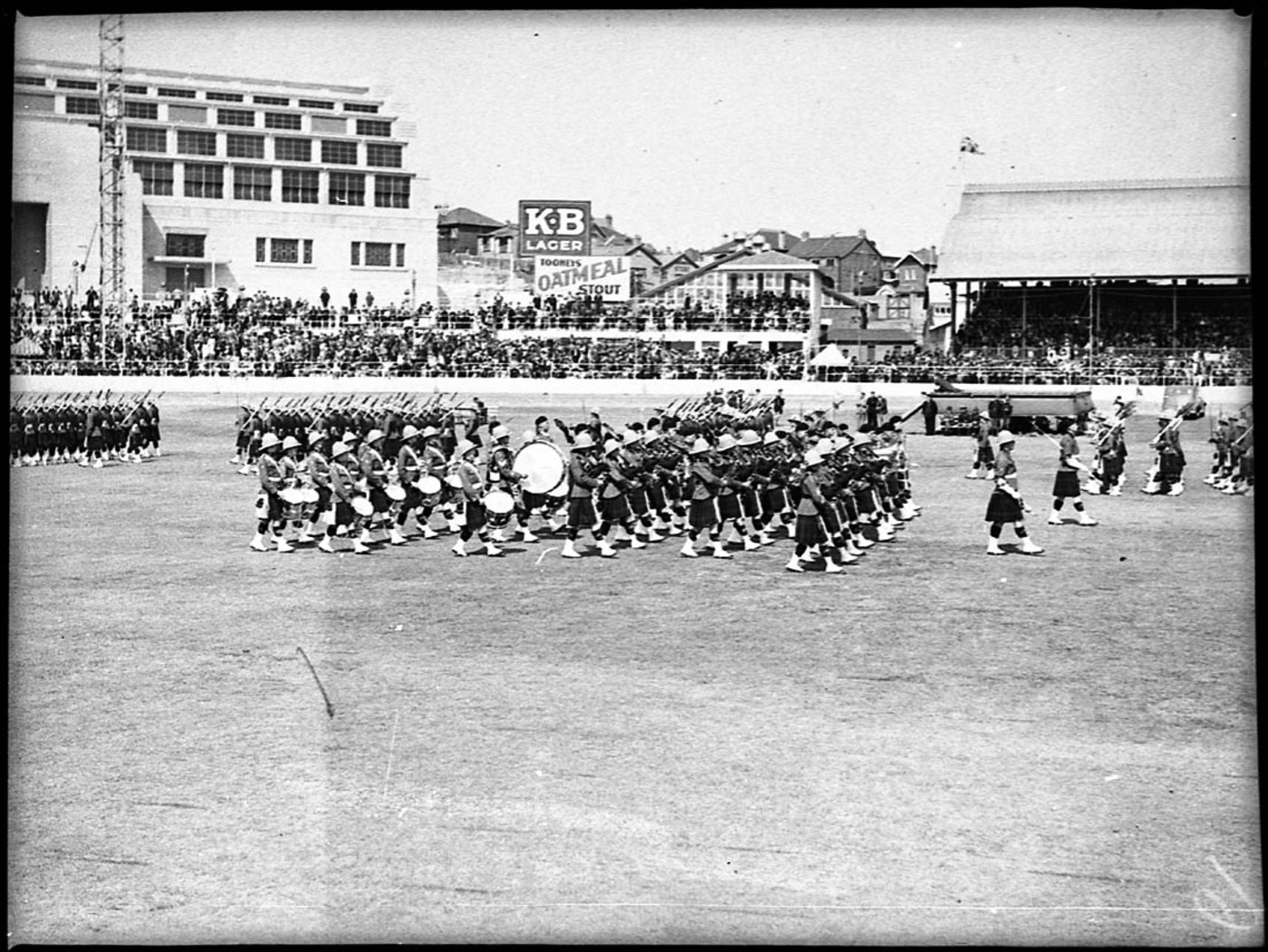
30th Battalion at the Highland Gathering, at the Sydney Showground, January 1939

The battalion was re-raised as part of the Citizens Force, based around Sydney, as the Army undertook a reorganisation designed to perpetuate the battle honours and numerical designations of the AIF in 1921. At this time the 30th Battalion was reformed from elements drawn from two Citizens Forces battalions: the 2nd Battalion, 4th Infantry Regiment and the 2nd Battalion, 30th Infantry Regiment. These units were able to trace their lineage back to the 25th Infantry Regiment and beyond that to the New South Wales Scottish Rifles, which had been formed in 1885 and had provided personnel to serve during the Boer War, for which they had received the "South Africa 1899–1902" battle honour. Upon formation, the battalion was once again assigned to the 8th Brigade, within the 2nd Military District.

In 1927, territorial designations were introduced and the 30th Battalion adopted the title of the "City of Sydney Regiment". The battalion's motto – In Ommi Modo Fidelis – was also authorised at this time. Two years later, in 1929–30, as a result of the economic hardships of the Great Depression and the manpower shortage that resulted from the decision to suspend the compulsory training scheme, the number of personnel available fell and it was decided to amalgamate a number of infantry battalions. As a result, in 1930 the 30th Battalion was amalgamated with the 51st Battalion to form the 30th/51st Battalion. In 1935, the two battalions were split once more and the 30th Battalion was re-raised. To maintain the Scottish heritage of the battalion's predecessor units, the 30th Battalion adopted the designation of the New South Wales Scottish Regiment at this time. It was also issued with Scottish military equipment including kilts, and adopted the tartan of the Black Watch, a Scottish unit of the British Army.

=== Second World War ===
Because the provisions of the Defence Act (1903) prohibited sending the Militia to fight outside of Australian territory, at the outset of the Second World War the Australian government decided to raise an all-volunteer force, known as the Second Australian Imperial Force (2nd AIF), for service overseas. (Note: This stipulation also applied to the 2,800 strong Permanent Military Force. Nevertheless, as the war progressed, 32 Militia battalions were employed on active service during the war, all but three of which were granted AIF status. Essentially this meant that as more than 65 per cent of their wartime establishment had volunteered for service overseas, the battalion could be sent anywhere, including outside of Australian territory.) While the Militia would provide a core of experienced personnel from which to recruit this force, their main role was to improve the nation's level of military preparedness by managing and administering the training of conscripts following the re-introduction of the compulsory training scheme in January 1940. To meet this requirement, Militia units were progressively called up to undertake brief periods of continuous service throughout 1940 and 1941.

At this time, the 30th Battalion was again attached to the 8th Brigade and undertook garrison duties in New South Wales. In March 1942, the 30th Battalion occupied defensive positions in North Sydney including beach defences to respond to possible Japanese landings at Manly, Freshwater Beach, and Curl Curl. Later the 30th was sent to Greta, where it concentrated with the rest of the 8th Brigade before being transferred to Western Australia. The 30th Battalion remained there until late 1943 when they were moved to Queensland to undertake training for possible deployment overseas. In early 1944, the units of the 8th Brigade were dispatched to New Guinea in support of the 9th Division which was taking part in the Huon Peninsula campaign. During this time, the 30th Battalion's most notable involvement came during the Battle of Sio. Further operations saw the battalion advance along the coast and occupy Madang and Alexishafen, before returning to garrison duties in the Madang–Hansa Bay area following the completion of the campaign. Later, in June 1945, the 30th Battalion was moved to Wewak where they provided a supporting role to the 6th Division’s campaign, conducting patrols around Mount Tazaki and Mount Shiburangu. During this time they were involved in a number of minor engagements with Japanese forces in the area, with the most notable coming in July when the battalion helped repel a Japanese attack on Australian positions around Mount Tazaki.

Following the end of hostilities, the battalion was disbanded at Chermside, Queensland in March 1946. 21 men from the 30th Battalion were killed in action or died on active service during the war, while another 20 men were wounded. The following decorations were bestowed upon members of the 30th Battalion for their service during the war: one Member of the Order of the British Empire (MBE), one MC, one British Empire Medal (BEM), three MMs and 14 MIDs.

=== Post war ===
By 1948 the demobilisation of Australia's wartime army had been completed. At this time the decision was made to re-raise the part-time military forces—this time under the guise of the Citizens Military Force (CMF)—and on a reduced establishment of just two complete divisions. The 30th Battalion was re-raised at this time, and was entrusted as custodian of the battle honours of the 2/30th Battalion, the 2nd AIF unit with which they were associated. Initially service in the post-war CMF was on a voluntary basis. In 1951, however, the compulsory training scheme was reintroduced and as a result the size of many CMF units swelled; nevertheless, the scheme was suspended in 1959 and this led to a significant decrease in the strength of many units. The following year, the Army introduced the Pentropic divisional structure and a wide-reaching re-organisation of the CMF structure was undertaken that saw a number of infantry battalions amalgamated or disbanded altogether as the regionally based single battalion regiments were replaced by six new multi-battalion State-based regiments. As part of this change, the 30th Battalion was reduced to a company-level organisation within the Pentropic 2nd Battalion, Royal New South Wales Regiment, forming 'A' Company (The New South Wales Scottish Company). Highland Laddie was approved as the battalion's regimental march in 1953 and in 1961 the battalion was awarded its Second World War battle honours, receiving four for their direct involvement in the conflict. At the same they were also entrusted with the four battle honours that the 2/30th Battalion received for its involvement in the fighting in Malaya and Singapore.

In 1965, the Australian Army's experiment with the Pentropic structure was abandoned and the CMF was once again reorganised. This reorganisation saw many of the Pentropic battalions, including the 2nd Battalion, Royal New South Wales Regiment, being once again split to form additional battalions. The 30th Battalion, however, was not re-raised at this time.

The Queen's and Regimental Colours of the 30th Battalion were laid up and are on display at St Stephen's Uniting Church, Sydney.

== Battle honours ==
The 30th Battalion received the following battle honours:

- South Africa 1899–1902; (Note: Inherited from the battalion's predecessor units.)
- First World War: Egypt 1915–16, Somme 1916–18, Bapaume 1917, Bullecourt, Ypres 1917, Menin Road, Polygon Wood, Poelcappelle, Passchendaele, Ancre 1918, Amiens, Albert 1918, Mont St Quentin, Hindenburg Line, Hindenburg Line, St Quentin Canal, St Quentin Canal, and France and Flanders 1916–18;
- Second World War: Malaya 1941–42, Johore, Gemas, Singapore Island, Madang, Sio–Sepik River, South-West Pacific 1942–1945, and Liberation of Australian New Guinea.

== Alliances ==
- United Kingdom – The Black Watch.

== Notes ==
Footnotes

Citations
