= Francis Derham =

Australian general

- Born: 15 May 1885; Camberwell, Victoria
- Died: 22 October 1957 (aged 72); East Melbourne, Victoria
- Relatives: Enid Derham (sister); Frederick Derham (uncle); Richard Hodgson (uncle); Sir David Derham (nephew)
- Military career
- Allegiance: Australia
- Branch: Citizens Military Force
- Service years: 1907–1943
- Rank: Major General
- Commands: 1st Division (1942–43); 4th Division (1940–42); 2nd Infantry Brigade (1933–39); 3rd Divisional Artillery (1927–33); 2nd Medium Artillery Brigade (1925–27); 2nd Field Artillery Brigade (1921–23); 8th Field Artillery Brigade (1920–21); 14th Field Artillery Brigade (1917–19); 3rd Divisional Ammunition Column (1917); 9th Field Artillery Brigade (1916–17); 23rd Battery, 8th Field Artillery Brigade (1915)
- Conflicts: First World War; Second World War
- Awards: Companion of the Order of the Bath; Distinguished Service Order; Colonial Auxiliary Forces Officers' Decoration; Mentioned in Despatches (4); Croix de Guerre (France)

Major General Francis Plumley Derham, CB, DSO, VD (15 May 1885 – 22 October 1957) was an Australian solicitor and a senior officer in the Australian Army during the Second World War.

Military offices
Preceded by Major General Cyril Clowes	General Officer Commanding 1st Division; 1942–1943	Succeeded by Major General Herbert Lloyd
Preceded by Major General John Whitham	General Officer Commanding 4th Division; 1940–1942	Succeeded by Major General Jack Stevens
