= Allan Boase =

Australian Army general

Allan Joseph Boase
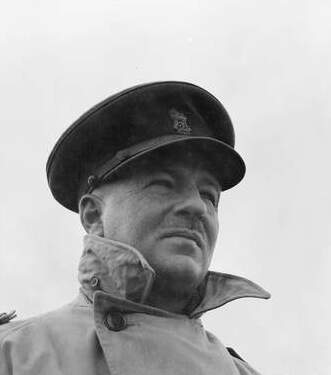
- Brigadier Allan Boase in Syria, January 1942
- Born: 19 February 1894; Gympie, Queensland
- Died: 1 January 1964 (aged 69); St Kilda East, Victoria
- Military career
- Allegiance: Australia
- Branch: Australian Army
- Service years: 1911–1951
- Rank: Lieutenant General
- Service number: NX366
- Commands: Southern Command (1949–51); Western Command (1945–46); 11th Division (1943–45); AIF Ceylon (1942); 16th Brigade (1941–42); Command and Staff School (1939–40)
- Conflicts: First World War; Gallipoli Campaign; Western Front; Second World War; North African campaign; New Guinea campaign
- Awards: Commander of the Order of the British Empire

Lieutenant General Allan Joseph Boase, CBE (19 February 1894 – 1 January 1964) was a soldier in the Australian Army, who served in the First World War and was a general during the Second World War.

== Early life ==
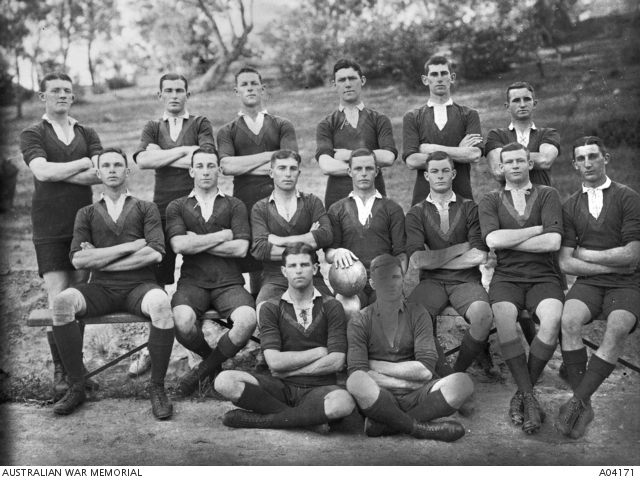
Members of the first fifteen, first grade rugby team, at the RMC, Duntroon, 1913. Allan J. Boase is sat on the floor on the right.

Allan Joseph Boase was born on 19 February 1894 at Gympie, in Queensland, to Charles and Harriet Boase. An English immigrant, his father was a journalist. One of four sons, Allan Boase was educated at Brisbane Grammar School and in 1911 entered the Royal Military College, Duntroon, in the Federal Capital Territory, from which he was commissioned in 1914 as part of the first class of cadets who were graduated early due to the outbreak of the First World War.

== Military career ==
Joining the 9th Battalion, Australian Imperial Force, in August 1914, he was shipped to Egypt the following month after the outbreak of the First World War. He was amongst the troops landed at Gallipoli on 25 April 1915, and together with his platoon, fought his way to Lone Pine. Wounded the following day, Boase was evacuated, only rejoining his unit in September. Following the withdrawal of the allied forces from Gallipoli, he was posted to the 12th Battalion, and his unit was posted to the Western Front in June 1916. Promoted to major at the end of the year, Boase performed staff duties for the remainder of the war within the headquarters of a number of brigades and the 5th Division.

During the inter-war years, Boase went to England to attend the Staff College, Camberley 1924 to 1925. Upon his return to Australia, he served in a number of staff positions as well as undertaking a military exchange position in India.

Shortly after the outbreak of the Second World War in September 1939, he was promoted to colonel. After serving as Commandant of the Command and Staff School in Sydney from November 1939 to April 1940, he was seconded to the Second Australian Imperial Force (2nd AIF) as quartermaster general of the 7th Division. Dispatched with the division to the Middle East in late 1940, he was promoted to temporary brigadier in late November and made responsible for the Base and Lines of Communication Units around Gaza, where the 2nd AIF had established its base. Boase was made a Commander of the Order of the British Empire in 1942.

After spending around eight months in command of 16th Brigade, Boase was transferred to Ceylon, as General Officer Commanding (GOC), AIF Ceylon in March 1942. After six months in this role, he returned to Australia as a major general to the General Staff, First Army, based at Toowoomba, Queensland. The following year, he was placed in command of the 11th Division, then in New Guinea. He led them through the Finisterre Range campaign until April 1945. He saw out the final months of the war as GOC, Western Command, in Perth.

== Later life ==
After the war, Boase was the Australian Army and defence representative in London until a temporary promotion to lieutenant general in March 1949. His final military posting was as GOC, Southern Command, based in Melbourne. He retired in 1951, remaining in Melbourne with his wife, Williamina, whom he had married in 1922. He died on 1 January 1964 of a coronary occlusion, survived by his wife and two children. His son, Neil, reached the rank of commodore in the Royal Australian Navy.

== Notes ==
Military offices
Preceded by Major General Cyril Clowes	General Officer Commanding 11th Division; 1943–1945	Succeeded by Major General Alan Ramsay
