= 29th Brigade (Australia) =

Infantry brigade of the Australian Army during World War II

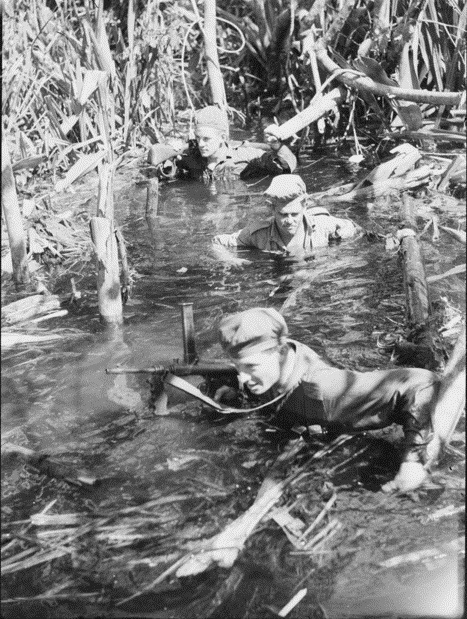
- A patrol from the 29th Brigade on Bougainville, January 1945
- Active: 1942–1945
- Country: Australia
- Branch: Australian Army
- Type: Infantry
- Size: ~3,500 personnel
- Part of: 5th Division (1941–44); 3rd Division (1944–45)
- Engagements: World War II: New Guinea campaign; Salamaua–Lae campaign; Bougainville campaign

Insignia
- Unit colour patch

The 29th Brigade was an infantry brigade of the Australian Army that was raised for service during World War II. Formed in late 1941 as part of the Militia, the brigade was initially formed for home defence in response to Japan's entry into the war. Composed of three Queensland-based infantry battalions and various supporting elements, the brigade initially undertook defensive duties around Townsville in 1941–1942 before deploying to New Guinea in 1943. There, the brigade undertook garrison duties before taking part in the Salamaua–Lae campaign. After a period of almost 18 months overseas, the brigade's elements were returned to Australia for a period of rest and reorganisation before later being assigned to the Bougainville campaign in 1944–1945. After the war, the brigade was disbanded in December 1945, along with its component units.

== History ==
Raised on 20 December 1941 under the command of Brigadier Thomas Louch for service during World War II, the 29th Brigade was formed as part of the Militia, Australia's part-time military force. The brigade's headquarters opened in January 1942 at Ascot, Queensland, and the formation was initially tasked with undertaking defensive duties in response to concerns about a possible invasion from the Japanese. In March 1942, two of the brigade's three infantry battalions—the 42nd and 47th Battalions—began concentrating in Tiaro where they formed part of the 5th Division. The 25th Battalion remained in Toowoomba, to reinforce the 7th Brigade.

After units of the Second Australian Imperial Force began to arrive in Australia to reinforce the east coast, in April 1942 the brigade began moving to Townsville. There, the 15th Battalion was assigned to the brigade, which took up defensive duties, constructing defences along line between Giru and Rollingstone. During the Battle of Coral Sea, when the threat of invasion seemed imminent, the brigade was moved to the coast, issued ammunition for the first time and stood-to in preparation for a Japanese landing. In the event, this invasion did not occur and the brigade was stood down, returning to more mundane garrison duties, before moving to Mount Spec, to undertake jungle training in preparation for overseas service.

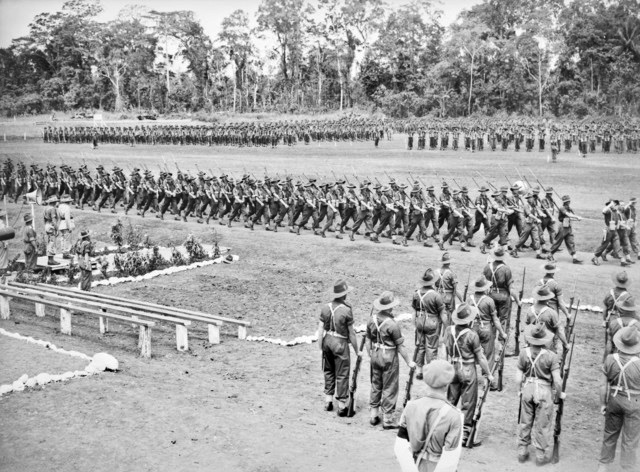
The 29th Brigade on parade at Lae on 8 March 1944.

In January 1943, with the threat of invasion over, the brigade was deployed to New Guinea, under the command of Brigadier Ray Monaghan. The 42nd Battalion moved to Rabi, near Milne Bay, to relieve the 7th Brigade's 61st Battalion, which had fought a successful defensive action there against the Japanese the previous year during the Battle of Milne Bay. Meanwhile, the 47th Battalion garrisoned Goodenough Island and the 15th Battalion was stationed at Gilli Gili. The brigade remained in the Milne Bay area until July 1943 when it was redeployed to Buna.

The brigade was later committed to the Salamaua–Lae campaign in August 1943, taking part in the final stages of the fighting around Mount Tambu, in support of the advance on Salamaua. Throughout late August and early September, the 15th Battalion launched an attack around the right flank of the US 162nd Infantry Regiment, against a Japanese position along the Lokanu and Scout Ridges. Against steep terrain and heavy resistance, the battalion eventually took the ridge, securing it by 9 September. Following up, on 9 September the 42nd Battalion attacked Charlie Hill as part of the final assault on Salamaua, which was captured several days later. Later, in early 1944, as the 7th Division advanced through the Markham and Ramu Valleys, the 15th Battalion assisted the division's operations around Lae, conducting patrols in the area while the remainder of the brigade remained at Salamaua for rest. In October, the whole brigade began mopping up operations from patrol bases around Hopoi, Musom and Markham Point. In early 1944, the brigade ceased operations and was relieved by the 23rd Brigade, and in June the brigade was withdrawn to Australia for rest and re-organisation having been deployed for over a year-and-a-half. The brigade was then concentrated around Petrie and Strathpine, in Queensland, in preparation for further action overseas. The brigade was subsequently assigned to the 3rd Division and 1944–1945 took part in the Bougainville campaign.

On Bougainville, the Australians had taken over from an American garrison in late 1944 in order to free up US troops for the fighting in the Philippines. Prior to their arrival, the US garrison had maintained a largely defensive posture, but the Australians launched a limited-scale offensive on the island which evolved into three main drives in the north, south and in the centre of the island. The 29th Brigade relieved the US 182 Infantry Regiment and was subsequently assigned to the southern drive towards Buin, where the main Japanese force was based.

The 15th Battalion commenced the brigade's campaign on Bougainville, being committed to the fighting in December 1944, while the 42nd and 47th Battalions joined them later the following month. During the initial stages, the 15th Battalion patrolled along the western coast, clearing the Japanese from an area between the Jaba and the Tavera Rivers. In early January, the 15th Battalion married up with the 42nd and 47th Battalions and the brigade advanced to Mawaraka, fighting a series of minor actions in the jungle and swamps before it was relieved by the 7th Brigade in the middle of the month, at which time the 29th Brigade was moved back to the major Australian base at Torokina for rest.

The 29th Brigade, now under the command of Brigadier Noel Simpson, who had taken over after Monaghan had been relieved of his command, was committed for a second effort in early July 1945 advancing from the Mivo River to the Oamai River during the final stages of the campaign. Two companies from the 15th Battalion led the advance, setting out from Sisikatekori, while the 47th Battalion positioned a company along the river near a track dubbed "Lawne's Track", and the 42nd sat stride the Buin Road, just short of the Mobiai River. The brigade's efforts to secure a crossing over the Silibai River were frustrated by determined Japanese defence which held them up between 3 and 10 July, when the Australians successfully pushed their way across. Temporary positions were then established on the opposite bank and the patrols began ranging south towards the Oamai River; further advances, though, were hampered by heavy rain, which held up the advance on the Japanese strong hold around Buin until the end of the war. The brigade's headquarters was disbanded in December 1945; its component units subsequently returned to Australia where they were disbanded during the early months of 1946.

== Assigned units ==
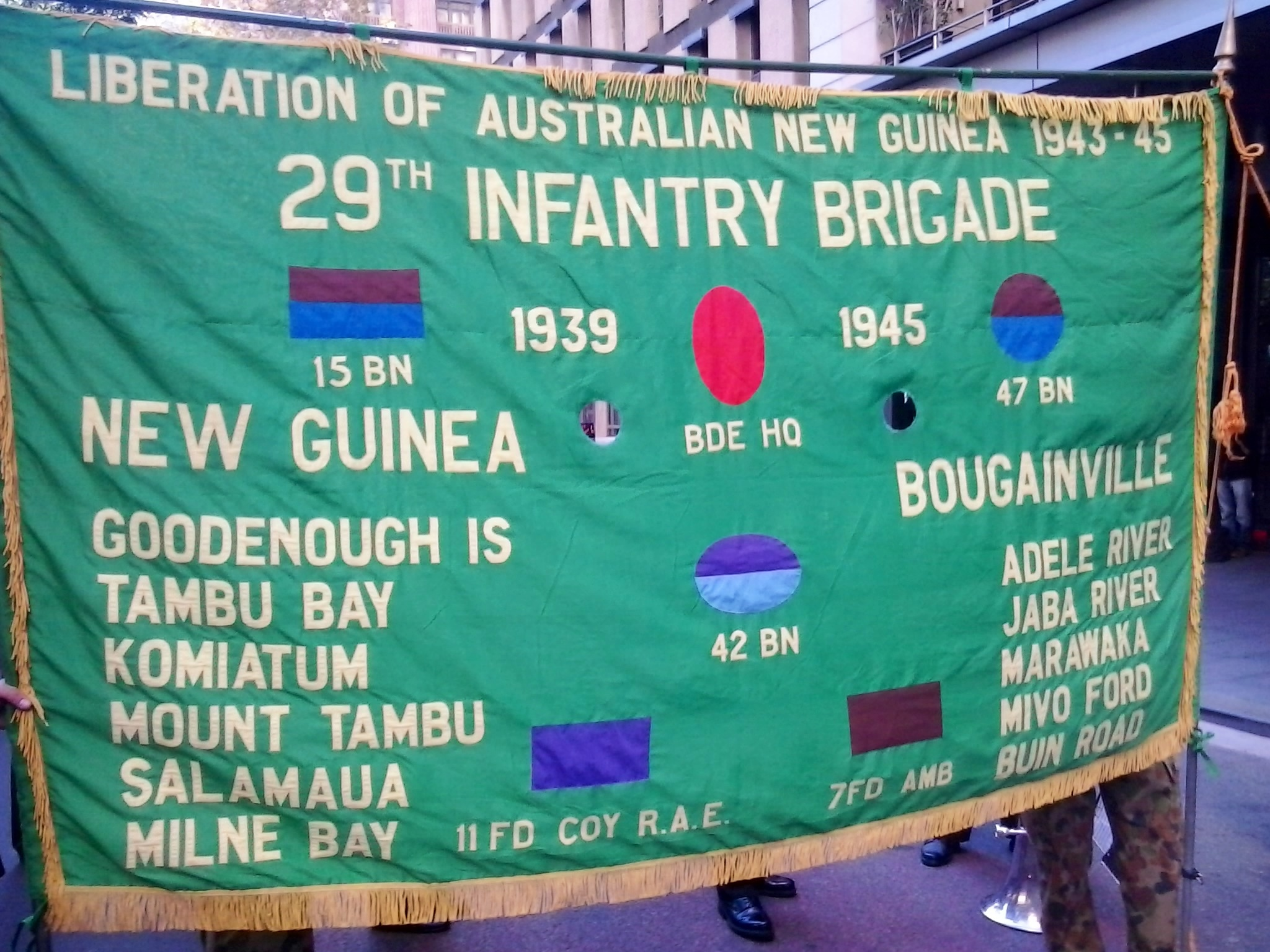
29th Infantry Brigade banner

The 29th Brigade typically consisted of:

- Brigade Headquarters;
  - 15th Battalion;
  - 42nd Battalion;
  - 47th Battalion;
  - 11 Field Company RAE
  - 7 Field Ambulance AAMC
  - Supporting artillery, and other units.

== Commanding officers ==
The following officers served as commanding officer of the 29th Brigade:

- Brigadier Thomas Louch (1941–42);
- Brigadier Raymond Monaghan (1942–45);
- Brigadier Noel Simpson (1945).
