= Sydney Rowell =

Australian general (1894–1975)

Sir Sydney Fairbairn Rowell
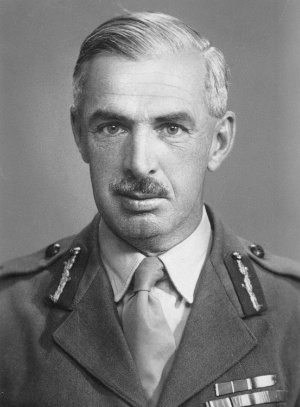
- Lieutenant General Rowell in 1948
- Born: 15 December 1894; Lockleys, South Australia
- Died: 12 April 1975 (aged 80); South Yarra, Victoria
- Military career
- Allegiance: Australia
- Branch: Australian Army
- Service years: 1914–54
- Rank: Lieutenant General
- Nickname: Syd
- Service number: VX3
- Unit: Staff Corps
- Commands: Chief of the General Staff (1950–54); I Corps (1942)
- Conflicts: First World War; Gallipoli Campaign; Second World War; Western Desert Campaign; Battle of Greece; Syria-Lebanon campaign; Kokoda Track campaign; Korean War
- Awards: Knight Commander of the Order of the British Empire; Companion of the Order of the Bath; Mentioned in Despatches (2); Greek War Cross (Class A)
- Other work: Director, Smith, Elder & Co. Director and Chairman, Commonwealth Aircraft Corporation

Lieutenant General Sir Sydney Fairbairn Rowell, KBE, CB (15 December 1894 – 12 April 1975) was an Australian soldier who served as Chief of the General Staff from 17 April 1950 to 15 December 1954. As Vice Chief of the General Staff from 8 January 1946 to 16 April 1950, he played a key role in the post-Second World War reorganisation of the Army, and in the 1949 Australian coal strike. However, he is best known as the commander who was dismissed in the Kokoda Track campaign.

As a young officer, Rowell served at Gallipoli but was invalided back to Australia with typhoid fever in January 1916. The end of the war found Rowell junior in rank to his contemporaries with more distinguished war records, but he managed to catch up in the post-war period. Rowell spent five years with the British Army or at British staff colleges, establishing valuable contacts with his British counterparts. In 1939 he was appointed chief of staff of the 6th Division and later I Corps, serving in that capacity in the Battle of Greece and the Syria-Lebanon campaign. In 1942 he commanded I Corps in the Kokoda Track campaign but was sacked. His subsequent rise to become Chief of the General Staff demonstrated that the circumstances of his dismissal in 1942 were indeed extraordinary.

== Early life ==
Sydney Fairbairn Rowell was born on 15 December 1894 at Lockleys, South Australia, the fourth son of James Rowell, an English-born soldier and orchardist who served as a senator from 1916 to 1922, and his Australian-born second wife Zella Jane née Williams. He acted as an 'unofficial batman' to his father, who was colonel commanding the South Australian Brigade from 1907 to 1911. Rowell was educated at Adelaide High School and was one of the first cadets to enter the Royal Military College, Duntroon when it opened in 1911.

== First World War ==
On 15 September 1914 Rowell and his classmates were commissioned as first lieutenants in the Australian Imperial Force (AIF). At the time, Rowell's class had not yet completed its military training. The AIF's commander, Major General William Throsby Bridges, decided that regimental duty would rectify that deficiency, so he allotted the Duntroon cadets as regimental officers of the AIF, rather than as staff officers. The cost of this decision was high; of the 134 commissioned in time to serve at the front, 42 were killed and 38 wounded. Cadets were posted to units being formed in their home states, so Rowell was posted to the 10th Infantry Battalion. When he discovered that the 3rd Light Horse Regiment was to be commanded by his cousin, Lieutenant Colonel F. M. Rowell, Sydney obtained permission to swap places with another member of his Duntroon class Lieutenant Eric Wilkes Talbot Smith. It was a fateful decision; Smith was fatally wounded on Anzac Day.

Rowell contracted pneumonia and did not embark with the main body of the 3rd Light Horse Regiment. Instead, he left with its First Reinforcements on HMAT Thirty-Six on 21 December 1914. Rowell joined the regiment in Heliopolis in January. The next month he broke his left leg in a riding accident. For a time it looked like Rowell would again miss the embarkation of his regiment, but the intervention of his father ensured that he reached Anzac Cove with the 3rd Light Horse on 12 May 1915. He was evacuated sick to Egypt and then Malta in July, and returned to his regiment at Quinn's Post in August. Rowell was promoted to the temporary rank of captain on 9 September, briefly assuming command of a squadron before becoming the regimental adjutant three days later. In November Rowell was again evacuated to Egypt, this time with typhoid fever, the disease that had killed his cousin. On 20 January 1916, Rowell was returned to Australia. Because of a policy that a regular officer, once invalided to Australia, could not again be posted overseas, Rowell's period of active service was over. He was posted, along with several other Duntroon graduates who had been invalided home, to Duntroon, as an instructor at the Officers' Training School. This was closed in June 1917 and Rowell was posted to the staff of the 4th Military District in Adelaide.

== Between the wars ==
On 20 August 1919 at the Chalmers Church, North Terrace, Adelaide, Rowell married Blanche May Murison, the daughter of a Scottish engineer. Blanche had served in the Royal Australian Army Nursing Corps in Australia during the war. Due to his brief overseas service, the end of the war found Rowell still a lieutenant and thus junior in rank to his contemporaries but the snail-like pace of promotions between the wars allowed him to gradually catch up. He was promoted to captain on 1 January 1920, major on 1 January 1926, and the brevet rank lieutenant colonel on 1 July 1935, with substantive rank on 1 January 1936. His inter-war career consisted of a long series of staff postings, interspersed with training courses.

In 1924, Rowell passed the staff college examination for one of the two Australian spots. Qualifying in first place gave him a choice between the Staff College, Camberley and its counterpart at Quetta, and Rowell chose the former, attending from 1925 to 1926. At this time, the commandant was Major General Edmund Ironside; the staff included Colonel J. F. C. Fuller and Lieutenant Colonels Alan Brooke and Bernard Montgomery. Fellow students included Captains Frank Messervy and Francis Tuker. From 1935 to 1937, Rowell was on exchange to the British Army as a staff officer with the 44th (Home Counties) Infantry Division. He then attended the Imperial Defence College. The class was a distinguished one, including two Victoria Cross winners, Group Captain Frank McNamara from Australia and Lieutenant Colonel George Pearkes from Canada; other students included Lieutenant Colonel William Slim and Wing Commander Keith Park. For his staff work, Rowell was made an Officer of the Order of the British Empire in the King's Birthday Honours in 1938.

Rowell returned to Australia to become Director of Military Operations and Intelligence at Army Headquarters in Melbourne but in August 1938 he became staff officer to the Inspector General, Lieutenant General Ernest Squires, partly because Rowell was recognised as "one of the ablest of the early Duntroon graduates" but also because he had spent five of the previous thirteen years with the British Army or at British staff colleges. The government's decision to appoint a British officer to produce an authoritative report into the Army was widely seen as demonstrating the government's lack of confidence in its own officer corps. Squires' first recommendation was to restructure the military districts into four "commands". This required legislation amending the Defence Act and was not implemented until October 1939. The second recommendation was the formation of a regular brigade. The death of Prime Minister Joseph Lyons in April 1939 and his subsequent replacement by Robert Menzies caused this to be shelved.

== Second World War ==
=== Libya ===
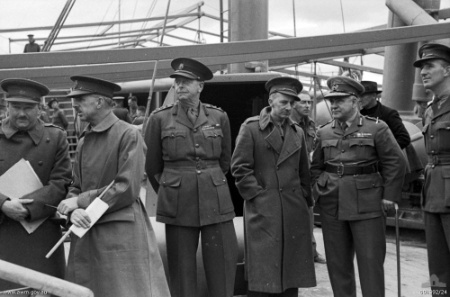
A group of Australian Army Officers waiting on the wharf during the embarkation of elements of the 6th Division AIF on the troopship carrying them to the Middle East. Left to right: Brigadier Sydney Rowell; Colonel Samuel Burston; Major Knight; and General Sir Thomas Blamey.

When the 6th Division was formed in October 1939, Sir Thomas Blamey appointed Rowell as its GSO1 (chief of staff). Rowell joined the Second Australian Imperial Force (AIF) and was given the AIF service number VX3. Gavin Long described Rowell as "clear and incisive in thought, sensitive in feeling, frank and outspoken in approach to men and to problems. Five recent years of service either at English staff colleges or on exchange duty made it probable that wherever he went his opposite numbers in British formations would be men with whom he had previously worked and played." Comparing him to the AA&QMG, Colonel George Alan Vasey, Long noted that both "were not only efficient soldiers but men of commanding temperament and talent".

Rowell was promoted to colonel on 13 October 1939, and when the government decided to form I Corps in April 1940, Blamey was given the command and Rowell became brigadier, general staff (BGS), with the rank of brigadier. Blamey and Rowell prepared I Corps for operations as best they could, completing the force's structure and integrating new units as they arrived in the Middle East. Rowell strove to establish good relations with the British Army, while occasionally having to remind them that the AIF was answerable to its own commander in chief and its own government. Rowell's efforts to create an administrative headquarters to free the I Corps staff for operational duties foundered on Blamey's reluctance to delegate authority. The best that he could achieve was the creation of a Base and Line of Communications Units command under Brigadier Allan Boase but I Corps remained responsible for organisation and training.

I Corps' part in the Western Desert Campaign was brief. Its headquarters opened near Benghazi on 15 February 1941, replacing British XIII Corps. Rowell studied the prospects of an advance on Tripoli, but the headquarters was recalled to Egypt on 24 February to participate in the Battle of Greece. Nonetheless, for his part, Rowell was mentioned in despatches, and appointed a Commander of the Order of the British Empire.

=== Greece ===
In Greece, I Corps was employed as such for the first time. The campaign was another short one, but very trying on the participants. Just three days after headquarters opened on 5 April 1941, the Germans broke through and the corps was thrown into a retreat that eventually led to its re-embarkation. Blamey and his staff worked under tremendous pressure; the operational situation was precarious; and German air attacks were frequent. Rowell later wrote:

What history should record is that, in the face of a desperate situation, HQ I Corps never lost control of the battle; made sound tactical decisions with limited resources; and succeeded finally in bringing its troops to the beaches with limited resources and with no loss of cohesion.

Tempers flared when I Corps headquarters was ordered to evacuate to Egypt. Blamey's aide recalled:

We had now come to our last hours in Greece. They were marked by tension and anger. When Rowell was told that he was to leave almost immediately to fly to Egypt with Blamey, his first reaction was to declare that he had no intention of leaving. The hostility in this exchange opened up a rift between the two men. Rowell had always been completely frank in putting his views to Blamey, but not defiant. On this occasion it took a sharp and direct order to remind Rowell who was in command.

If Rowell felt that Blamey had shown a lack of moral courage in failing to stand up to the political and military superiors who had directed the ill-fated campaign, Blamey felt that the campaign had revealed flaws in Rowell's character. He wrote to the Chief of the General Staff, Lieutenant General Vernon Sturdee:

Rowell has very great ability; is quick in decision and sound in judgement. There can be no question of his personal courage, but he lacks the reserves of nervous energy over a period of long strain. I found him difficult in the last days in Greece and, as commander, had to exercise considerable tact. Rather a reverse of what it should be. I was a little disappointed in both him and Bridgeford over their attitude in one or two matters. They were over-impressed with the danger of the dive bomber and talked a little too freely about its effect on the men. However, a short rest fixed them both up and they are doing a great job in Syria.

For his part in the campaign in Greece, Rowell was mentioned in despatches a second time.

=== Syria ===
I Corps was alerted to take part in the Syria-Lebanon Campaign although, Blamey having been promoted to Deputy Commander in Chief Middle East Command, it lacked a commanding officer. Apparently, General Sir Henry Maitland Wilson believed that I Corps' loss of transport and signal equipment precluded it from participating in the campaign from the outset. Instead, Wilson attempted to exercise command from the King David Hotel. This proved to be a serious error, as his staff were preoccupied with political and administrative issues, and were too remote from the battlefields to exercise the close command required—something that Rowell foresaw. Following a series of reverses, Rowell predicted on 16 June that "it won't be long now." I Corps headquarters was sent for on 18 June, and Lieutenant General John Lavarack assumed command that day.

=== Defence of Australia ===
In August 1941, Rowell returned to Australia to take up the post of Deputy Chief of the General Staff (DCGS), with the rank of major general. He expected that his main task would be to support the AIF; but it turned out the primary concern was the looming war with Japan, which broke out soon after. It was at this juncture that Rowell was approached by Major General George Vasey, who had a scheme to retire all officers over the age of fifty, and making Major General Horace Robertson Commander in Chief. Presumably Vasey expected Rowell, as a fellow Duntroon graduate, to be sympathetic. A heated argument ensued, ending with Rowell telling Vasey that "if he weren't so bloody big, I'd toss him out of the room". Rowell immediately went to Sturdee, who had Lavarack with him, and told him what had transpired.

In Blamey's subsequent shake-up of higher command arrangements, Rowell was appointed to command I Corps. This was his first command since his three-day stint in command of a light horse squadron at Gallipoli. He became the first Duntroon graduate to command a corps, and the first to be promoted to the rank of lieutenant general. The old I Corps headquarters was largely absorbed into Lavarack's new First Army headquarters, so a new one was formed from Headquarters, Southern Command. Initially located in Melbourne, it soon moved to Esk, Queensland.

=== Kokoda Track ===
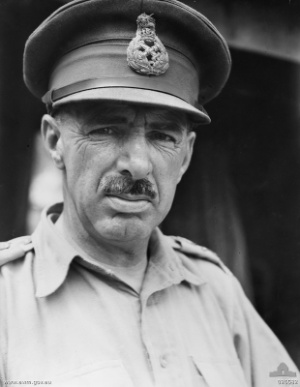
Rowell at Port Moresby in September 1942

On 31 July 1942, Blamey informed Rowell that I Corps headquarters would be sent to Port Moresby to control operations in New Guinea. Rowell arrived in Port Moresby on 13 August 1942 and assumed command of New Guinea Force from Major General Basil Morris. Rowell's I Corps headquarters took over operational control from Morris's, which became that of ANGAU. The only warning that Morris had of Rowell's arrival was a message from the DCGS, Vasey, which simply said: "Syd is coming". The situation was dire. Japanese were steadily advancing on Port Moresby along the Kokoda Track and were also threatening Milne Bay and Wau. Rowell and his staff were all seasoned officers with combat experience in the Middle East and the Battle of Malaya and "brought to New Guinea skill and organisation that Morris and his staff had been unable to provide". However, the main body of Rowell's staff did not arrive until 17 August. Rowell turned down a suggestion from Blamey that he needed additional base staff to cope with his administrative problems, given that a corps headquarters was a tactical headquarters, intended to operate as part of an army, with the latter handling most of the administrative work. Rowell's staff gradually discovered how enormous the task before them was; they had few maps, the only transport aircraft were destroyed in a Japanese raid, and the supplies that had been forwarded by air to Kokoda could not be located.

Rowell refused to give General Douglas MacArthur's General Headquarters (GHQ) in Brisbane a "ball to ball" description of the action, sending only factual information at stated times. Failure to keep GHQ up to date could only lead to fears of the worst, which were confirmed when Major General George Kenney reported that in his opinion Port Moresby would soon fall unless something drastic was done, and Rowell was "defeatist". On 17 September, the General MacArthur discussed the situation in New Guinea with Prime Minister John Curtin on a secure phone. He pointed out that while the Japanese faced all the same difficulties as the Australian troops fighting on the Kokoda Track, the Japanese were advancing and the Australians were retreating, and the whole situation seemed to MacArthur to be a lot like the Malaya. He recommended that General Blamey be sent up to New Guinea to take personal command of the situation.

"I'm leaving for New Guinea in a few days," Blamey told Burston, his Director General of Medical Services, on 18 September.

"Why?" Burston asked. "Are you worried about New Guinea?"

"No," said Blamey, "But Canberra's lost it!"

They were talking in Blamey's office in Victoria Barracks, Melbourne. Blamey had just had talks on the secraphone with both Curtin and MacArthur. Each of them had instructed him to go to Port Moresby. These were not recommendations or requests; they were orders for every practical purpose.

"I remember what happened to the Auk in the desert and I'm off!" Blamey told Burston.

Blamey took over command of New Guinea Force, but not I Corps. The difference was academic insofar as there was only one staff. Blamey wrote a letter to Rowell to explain the situation in advance of his arrival in Port Moresby on 23 September:

The powers that be have determined that I shall myself go to New Guinea for a while and operate from there... I hope you will not be upset at this decision, and will not think that it implies any lack of confidence in yourself. I think it arises out of the fact that we have very inexperienced politicians who are inclined to panic on every possible occasion, and I think that the relationship between us personally is such that we can make the arrangement work without any difficulty.

Rowell took it very badly. He wrote to Major General Cyril Clowes at Milne Bay:

The plain fact is that he [Blamey] hasn't enough moral courage to fight the Cabinet on an issue of confidence in me. Either I am fit to command the show or I am not. If the latter, then I should be pulled out. He comes here when the tide is on the turn and all is likely to be well. He cannot influence the local situation in any way, but he will get the kudos and it will be said, rather pityingly, that he came here to hold my hand and bolster me up.

On 25 September, at MacArthur's suggestion, Blamey flew to Milne Bay with Brigadier General Kenneth Walker and ordered Clowes to send a force by air to Wanigela. This would be an important step forward. Rowell, Kenney noted, was "not even consulted anymore". Rowell was furious at Blamey bypassing him. Blamey reported back to Prime Minister Curtin that:

On arrival here I informed General Rowell of my instructions from the Prime Minister and the CinC SWPA [MacArthur]. He proved most difficult and recalcitrant considering himself very unjustly used. I permitted him to state his case with great frankness. It was mainly statement of grievances primarily against myself because he had received only one decoration for war services in Middle East where certain other officers had received two.

He charged me with having failed to safeguard his interests and he felt he was being made to eat dirt. All my persuasion could not make him see matters realistically.

On second evening I asked General Burston as an old friend of Rowell to endeavour to induce a proper frame of mind but Burston met with no success.

Instead of setting out full information here for me I have to search out details and feel a definite atmosphere of obstruction.

Urge that Herring be sent immediately by air as successor to Rowell. If Herring not approved, Mackay second choice but Herring much younger, this important in this climate.

Re disposal of Rowell if you decide to continue his services he could replace Herring in command of II Corps but events here make me doubtful of wisdom of allocating disgruntled officer to this appointment. In this connection Morshead now cables that he would be glad to accept Stevens as second in command AIF in Middle East. Rowell competent to fill Darwin which is a major general's command. II Corps command could be operated by senior division commander temporarily and by General Eichelberger with a mixed American and Australian staff.

=== Exile ===
On further consideration, Blamey decided that he might need Stevens, "a first rate fighter", and that it would be better to send Rowell to the Middle East, although such a move would involve Rowell being reduced in rank to major general so as to be junior to Morshead. Rowell paid a visit to MacArthur in Brisbane on his way south. MacArthur was unimpressed. He told the Prime Minister that "Rowell's attitude to a superior officer in a theatre of active operations was quite unpardonable" and hoped for Rowell's sake that there would be no enquiry into the matter. MacArthur was dissatisfied with the way that Rowell had prosecuted the campaign in Papua, and was opposed to Rowell returning to New Guinea. MacArthur later told Curtin that he would never agree to Rowell being given a command again. Curtin granted Rowell an interview on 3 October. He explained to Rowell that Blamey had gone to New Guinea on his orders and had expressed the fullest confidence in his commanders in New Guinea.

Not until the end of January did the Prime Minister finally decide to send Rowell to the Middle East, as a major general. By the time Rowell arrived in the Middle East, Morshead and most of the troops had departed. Rowell filed regular reports on the progress of the war in the Mediterranean, and processed Australian prisoners of war who had been liberated from the Italians. In December 1943, Rowell took up the appointment as Director of Tactical Investigation at the War Office in London vice Lieutenant General Alfred Reade Godwin-Austen at the instigation of Richard Casey. Despite the important sounding title and a "high powered staff", the job was a sinecure. When Blamey and Curtin visited London in May 1944, Rowell was on his "best behaviour". For his services at the War Office, Rowell was appointed a Companion of the Order of the Bath in the 1946 New Year Honours.

== Post-war ==
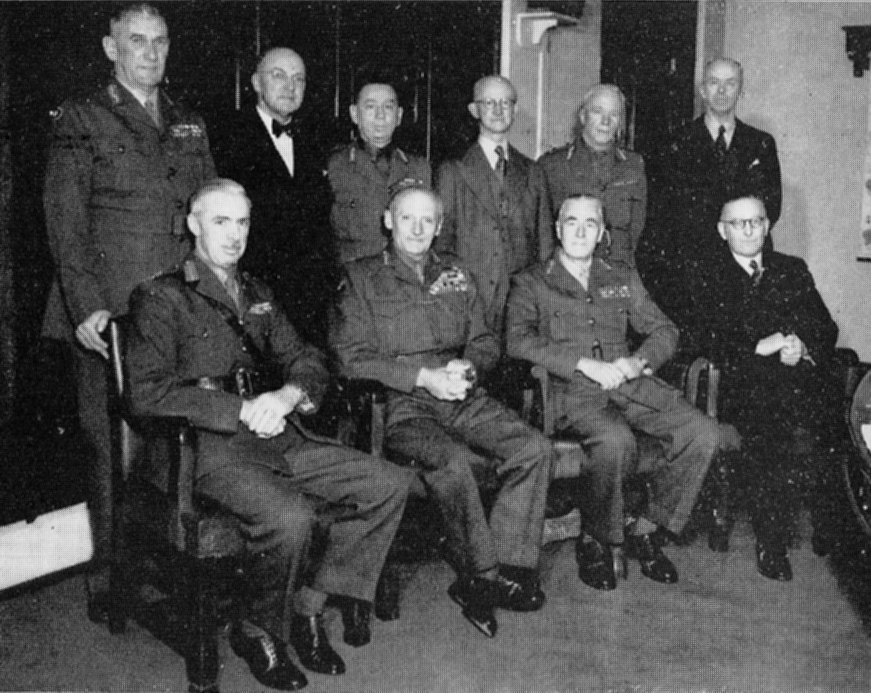
The Military Board in 1947, with Field Marshal Bernard Montgomery, 1st Viscount Montgomery of Alamein. Rowell is on the left.

Blamey's appointment as Commander in Chief was terminated in November 1945 and the new prime minister Ben Chifley appointed Sturdee in his place. Rowell was recalled from Europe to assume the new post of Vice Chief of the General Staff. He dropped in on Chifley in Canberra at the Prime Minister's invitation. "I hate bloody injustice!" Chifley told him. Rowell presided over the Army's transition to peacetime.

=== Coal strike ===
In June 1949, while Rowell was acting Chief of the General Staff, the country was rocked by the 1949 Australian coal strike. The strike began when stocks of coal were already low, especially in New South Wales and rationing was introduced. The Chifley government turned to the Army to get the troops to mine coal. This became possible when the transport unions agreed to transport coal that was mined. Rowell delegated responsibility for planning and organising the effort to Lieutenant General Berryman, while Rowell flew "top cover", liaising with the government ministers in Sydney. Rowell managed to get the government to pay a bonus to soldiers mining coal, and persuaded the government to allow soldiers to have beer in their canteens, although the local civilians had none. Soldiers began mining at Muswellbrook and Lithgow on 1 August and by 15 August, when the strike ended, some 4,000 soldiers and airmen were employed. They continued work until production was fully restored.

=== Chief of the General Staff ===
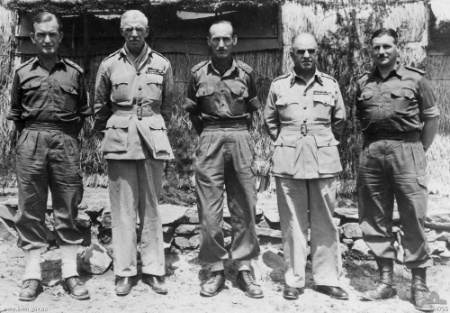
Senior Australian Army Officers in Korea 1953. Rowell is second from the left.

Sturdee retired in April 1950 and Rowell became the first Duntroon graduate to become Chief of the General Staff, the post of Vice Chief disappearing for a generation. Within months, Australian troops would be committed to the Korean War. Rowell paid visits to Korea in 1952 and 1953. He presided over the Korean War expansion of the Regular Army, the National Service Scheme, and the re-establishment of the women's services. Rowell, as Chief of the General Staff, was Army's chief mourner at Blamey's funeral in 1951, also serving as one of the pallbearers along with Frank Berryman, William Bridgeford, Edmund Herring, Iven Mackay, Leslie Morshead, John Northcott, Stanley Savige, Vernon Sturdee, and Henry Wells. For his services as Chief of the General Staff, Rowell was created a Knight Commander of the Order of the British Empire in the Queen's Birthday Honours in 1953.

== Later life ==
Rowell retired from the Army on 15 December 1954, following a ceremony at Duntroon, where his career had begun over 43 years before. He turned to gardening, cricket, horse-racing, reading, and crossword puzzles. He became a director of Smith, Elder & Co. in 1954 and of the Commonwealth Aircraft Corporation in 1956, serving as its chairman from 1957 to 1968. From 1958 to 1968 he was chairman of the Australian Boy Scouts' Association and a member of the Rhodes Scholarships Selection Committee for Victoria. He was offered but declined the post of Australian consul general in New York. In 1974 he published his memoirs, entitled Full Circle—the only Chief of the General Staff to have done so. Rowell died at his South Yarra home, twelve days before Lady Rowell, and was cremated. They were survived by their daughter. Sir Ivor Hele's portrait of Rowell is held by the Australian War Memorial, as are his papers.

== Notes ==
Military offices
Preceded by Lieutenant General Vernon Sturdee	Chief of the General Staff; 1950–1954	Succeeded by Lieutenant General Henry Wells
Preceded by Lieutenant General John Lavarack	GOC I Corps; April – September 1942	Succeeded by Lieutenant General Edmund Herring
