= New Guinea Air Warning Wireless =

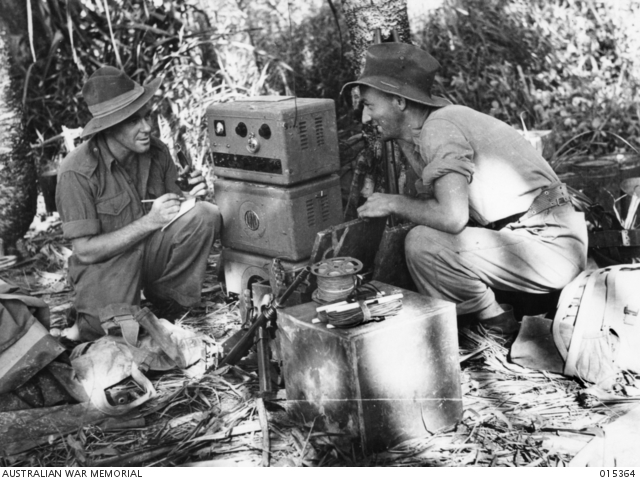
- NGAWW signallers near Nassau Bay, July 1943
- Active: 1942–45
- Country: Australia
- Branch: Australian Army
- Type: Signals
- Role: Early warning and surveillance
- Part of: New Guinea Force
- Garrison/HQ: Port Moresby; Nazdab
- Nickname: The Spotters
- Engagements: World War II: New Guinea Campaign

Commanders
- Notable commanders: Donald Small

Insignia
- Unit colour patch

The New Guinea Air Warning Wireless, also known as the "New Guinea Air Warning Wireless Company", "NGAWW", or "The Spotters", was a unique signals unit of the Australian Army formed in January 1942 in Port Moresby, Territory of Papua, during World War II, to provide early warning of Japanese air attack, and subsequently providing surveillance of shipping and ground-based troops. During the first month of operations 16 stations were established, with positions set up along the Papuan coast as well as in the mountains near Port Moresby. They often operated behind Japanese lines and were at risk of being captured by the Japanese due to the nature of their operations, while a number of outstations were over-run and the men manning them killed. By the end of 1942 the company was maintaining 61 operational stations and had a strength of 180 men.

Eventually, at its peak in late 1944 there were more than 150 spotter stations deployed on islands and mainland territories throughout Papua, New Guinea and Dutch New Guinea. The company's headquarters moved to Nadzab in June 1944, by which time stations had been established as far as Hollandia. However, in September 1944 the Australian military decided that it would not agree to American requests for the unit to serve outside the Australian area of operations and it was subsequently withdrawn after being left without a future operational role. Returning to Australia, it was disbanded in April 1945. Many of its members received awards for their actions, with the company having the distinction of being Australia's most highly decorated signals unit of World War II.

== History ==
=== Makeshift arrangements ===
The unit that became the New Guinea Air Warning Wireless Company (NGAWW) was initially formed in Port Moresby in late January 1942 from volunteers primarily from the 39th Infantry Battalion, a Militia battalion sent to hastily garrison Port Moresby following Japan's entry into the war. The unit was raised as a result of the experiences of the ill-fated Australian garrison at Rabaul, where the lack of an early warning system to detect Japanese air raids and the movement of an invasion force had complicated its defence before it was ultimately overwhelmed. Operating in a similar manner as the Coastwatchers, they were considered a "top-secret" signals unit. The role of the NGAWW was initially to provide warning of Japanese air raids around Port Moresby. Later, it would be expanded to allow the reporting of Japanese movements by air, land and sea across the South West Pacific Area (SWPA). Other tasks included the long-range transmission of general intelligence about the enemy, friendly force information, meteorological data and the provision of administrative communications for the Australian New Guinea Administrative Unit (ANGAU).

Attached to New Guinea Force, the company was conceived by Major Donald Small, Chief Signals Officer of the 8th Military District, who, having experienced the Japanese air raids on Rabaul, observed that the lack of an effective early-warning system around New Britain had resulted in the defenders being caught by surprise when attacked. By employing volunteers from Army units stationed in the area, he planned a network of observation posts, each equipped with a wireless transmitter to screen Port Moresby around a 150-kilometre (93 mi) radius, providing early warning of air raids, in addition to data on their size, height and strength. The decision of the territory administration to withdraw the civilian wireless operators following the entry of Japan into the war had also left holes in the coastwatching network, reducing its effectiveness. In the nine days following the fall of Rabaul, hasty arrangements were made by Small to assemble an ad hoc group of volunteer infantrymen with only a little signals training using civilian wireless equipment for deployment to the north coast with the assistance of two Short Sunderland flying boats from the Royal Australian Air Force (RAAF).

=== Initial activities ===
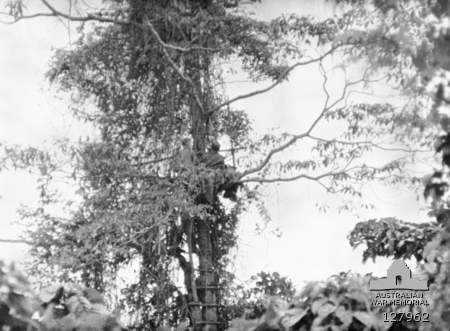
Kirkwood's Spotter's Post at Salamaua

The first group of "spotters" left Port Moresby on 1 February 1942 for the Samarai area, at the strategically important tip of Papua. The NGAWW issued its first air warning on 3 February after spotters at Tufi observed Japanese aircraft heading towards Port Moresby to attack it for the first time. During the first month of operations 16 stations were established, with positions set up along the Papuan coast as well as in the mountains near Port Moresby. The control station for this group was located at Awala, while there was a rear link to company headquarters at Rouna, approximately 34 kilometres (21 mi) from Port Moresby. However, whilst the outer perimeter was able to provide the anti-aircraft defences at Port Moresby with approximately an hour's warning of an air raid, the system would be unable to track approaching aircraft if they changed course after crossing the reporting line. As a consequence a second, inner perimeter, was established in March, at a range of 50 kilometres (31 mi) from Port Moresby to provide ten minutes' warning of an attack.

The air warning system was set up so that the inner perimeter stations were under RAAF control, while the outer stations were supervised by the Royal Australian Navy (RAN). In addition, there were a number of spotter stations set up and manned by the New Guinea Volunteer Rifles, as well as a few civilian stations reporting to ANGAU. In March the crew of a shot-down Japanese bomber were engaged from an observation post at Gona by a team of spotters, resulting in the killing of the first Japanese in Papua by Australian ground forces. Working with Kanga Force, a network was set up around Wau in May. For three weeks in June 1942, spotters manned an observation post in a tree just 300 yards (270 m) from the Japanese airstrip at Salamaua. Spotter Ross Kirkwood was photographed by Damien Parer in this post with an agreement not to release the pictures. Yet the photos were soon published in a newspaper in Sydney and the observation post was attacked by the Japanese the day after, with Kirkwood forced to make a narrow escape. In July 1942, the Buna station reported the landing of Japanese forces in Papua, an event which marked the commencement of the Kokoda Track Campaign.

=== Formation of the NGAWW ===
Following the rapid expansion that had been required to provide effective coverage in response to the crises caused by the initial Japanese movements a review of the makeshift organisation was undertaken. In October 1942, the NGAWW Company was officially formed as part of New Guinea Force Signals to consolidate the Army, RAAF and Coastwatcher stations. Meanwhile, efforts were made to standardise equipment across the network and to implement common procedures. The company subsequently came under command of New Guinea Force Signals and its headquarters was established at 9-mile near Port Moresby. Captain Thomas Warren was in command of the company at this time. The establishment of the company at this time included a headquarters, a Moresby area section, a sub-area section, and a spotting station. Sub-area sections were raised as required and at various times were located at Milne Bay, Dobodura, Wau, Bena Bena, Bulolo, Nadzab, Gusap, Hollandia and Aitape. By the end of 1942 the company was maintaining 61 operational stations and had a strength of 180 men. In mid-1943, Warren was transferred to Milne Force and he handed over command temporarily to Captain Gordon King. (Note: King also commanded No. 2 Company, 18th Line of Communications Signals at the time.)

In October 1943, the unit was given "Separate Independent Establishment" status under the control of New Guinea Force, (Note: Lord and Tennant state that this occurred in July 1943; however, according to the Australian War Memorial, Barker, White, and Mansfield it occurred in October 1943.) becoming the only non-commando independent company. Prior to this they had been known as No. 4 Company, 18th Line of Communication Signals (NGAWW Company). (Note: According to Lord and Tennant the unit's full title reportedly became the 2nd/1st Independent Cavalry Commando Squadron, New Guinea Air Warning Wireless Company AIF at this time. However, none of the major histories of the unit mention it being named as such, including neither Barker, Mansfield, Perrin or White. Perrin refers to the unit as No. 4 Company, 18th Line of Communication Signals (NGAWW Company), which is supported by "Appendix A to NGF G/4767/3D of 12 October 1943" (PDF). Dexter refers to it as the New Guinea Air Warning Wireless Unit.) They were subsequently authorised to wear the commando "double diamond" colour patch in 1944. The unit colour patch was made up of the double diamonds of the independent companies (later commando companies) in purple (denoting divisional engineers or signals) on a grey background with the white over blue flash of the Corps of Signals, initially in a zigzag pattern forming a "W", but later as a rectangle in the centre of the field. The grey background represented a unit of the Second Australian Imperial Force (Second AIF) and distinguished it from units raised as part of the First AIF during World War I. The officer commanding, Major Cyril Guiney, who had recently taken over command, applied for an increased establishment at this time to expand the size of the unit and allow it to take an increased role in anticipation of employment outside of SWPA; however, this was ultimately not approved.

=== Subsequent operations ===
In some cases, travelling through unmapped areas, men took up to six weeks just to reach their destinations. They often had to carry all their supplies, arms and their radio, often with the help of Papuan carriers. Teams of two or three spotters typically maintained the stations, each led by an acting non-commissioned-officer (NCO), working in isolation from friendly forces in remote locations for extended periods of time. The teams survived on limited rations, usually supplemented by native food sources. Once their initial supplies were expended they usually had to fend for themselves, although stations were also sometimes re-supplied by airdrop or by sea, but usually only in the event of a failure of mission essential equipment, or when petrol for the radios ran low. Spotting stations were usually only lightly armed, being usually equipped with just one Owen Gun with 600 rounds for the NCO in charge, and a rifle with only 50 rounds for each other man.

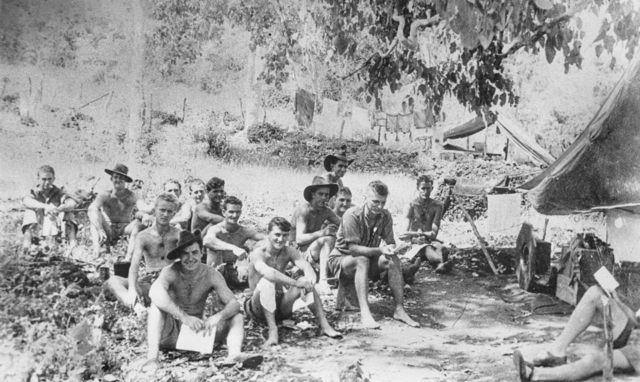
Spotters from the New Guinea Air Warning Wireless Company reading mail at Rouna Falls in Papua in May 1942

Personnel from the company were often at risk of being captured by the Japanese due to the nature of their operations, while a number of outstations were over-run and the men manning them killed. Indeed, the landing of Japanese forces on Papua in 1942 had required a shift from providing air raid warnings to furnishing military intelligence. As a result, many stations found themselves isolated behind Japanese lines, relying on the support of the native population whilst evading capture in order to continue operating. Later, as the tide of war turned in the Allies' favour, it became necessary for the spotters to move ahead of the advancing Allied forces and also compelled the spotters to work in close proximity to Japanese forces. In 1944, a team operated a station on Lake Rombebai, 150 kilometres (93 mi) in advance of the nearest Allied forces. Between them the spotters rescued or buried more than 200 crashed American and Australian airmen, caring for the injured and arranging safe transport for others.

In early 1944, the unit was reorganised as the war moved north and planning began for it to deploy further afield. Major Lennard Cumpston took over command from Guiney in March. Meanwhile, in March and April a number of stations closed or transferred to ANGAU following a reduction in the threat of large-scale air raids against Australian controlled territory. As debate about the future employment of Australian forces in the Pacific continued, the future of the unit was in doubt and there was consideration given to it being disbanded. However, following a request from the Americans a detachment of 43 signalers, cipher operators, and medical orderlies was subsequently attached to US forces during operations as part of the advance to Hollandia and Tadji, with the NGAWW being the only Australian unit involved in this action.

In April 1944, five USAAF personnel, as well as four officers and 20 enlisted men from the US Signal Corps, were seconded to the NGAWW to be trained as spotters for the purpose of establishing the American Air Warning Wireless Unit to function in the Philippines. The company's headquarters moved to Nadzab in June 1944, by which time stations had been established as far as Hollandia, with many behind Japanese lines. (Note: Barker states that company headquarters had been at Nadzab since March 1944, while the Australian War Memorial lists the move as having occurred in June.) Eventually, at its peak in late 1944 there were more than 150 spotter stations deployed on islands and mainland territories throughout Papua, New Guinea and Dutch New Guinea. However, in September 1944 the Australian military decided that it would not agree to American requests for the unit to serve outside the Australian area of operations and it was subsequently withdrawn after being left without a future operational role. Meanwhile, Captain John Marsh took over command from Cumpston who was posted to Washington as a liaison officer. Marsh then oversaw the closure of the remaining network and the preparation of the unit for shipping back to Australia. The spotters were subsequently concentrated at Nadzab, with many meeting each other face-to-face for the first time. The unit left New Guinea in December 1944.

=== Disbandment ===
After Christmas leave the company concentrated at Balcombe in Victoria where it was officially disbanded on 20 April 1945, although many of the men continued to serve in other signals units until the end of the war. Although complete records were unable to be maintained, a nominal roll of the unit lists the names of approximately 792 men that served in the NGAWW. During its service, the unit lost eight men killed in action, while another three died of other causes while on active service. The company had the distinction of being Australia's most highly decorated signals unit of World War II, with its members receiving one Member of the Order of the British Empire, ten Military Medals, and ten Mentions in Despatches. Numerous Commendation Cards were also awarded by the Commander-In-Chief. Flight Lieutenant Leigh Vial (then an RAAF pilot officer working as a Coastwatcher) was also awarded the US Distinguished Service Cross for service behind the lines around Salamaua during a joint mission with NGAWW personnel.

== Equipment ==
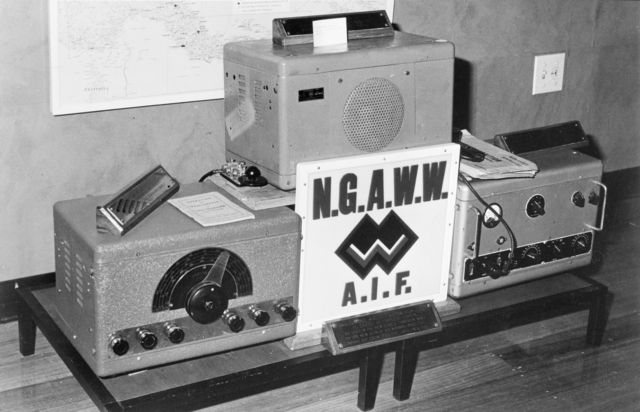
AWA 3BZ Teleradio

The spotters were initially equipped with Teleradio 3A sets and amateur equipment; however, many outstations later had these replaced by improved 3B and 3BZ sets to provide higher power communications. This occurred following a decision to standardise on the 3B following the formation of the NGAWW. In addition, some teams operating in more difficult jungle and mountain terrain, such as that closer to Port Moresby, were equipped with RAAF supplied ATR-2 radios which were lighter than the Teleradio 3A sets provided to the more distant outstations.

The Australian-designed and manufactured Type 3 Teleradio transmitter/receiver had been developed prior to the war by AWA to provide long-range wireless communications across Australia and in the surrounding islands of New Guinea, the Solomons, and Fiji where the plantations, airstrips, mines and settlements were widely separated. The isolated nature of civilian out-stations in these areas meant that there was no other means of communication available.

Even before the outbreak of hostilities the RAN had organised many civilian wireless users in the islands of the Pacific into networks of "spotters", known as Coastwatchers, in order to provide reports of any suspicious activities. Some were issued with the new 3B sets; however, following suggestions for improvements as the spotters developed their communications techniques, the Teleradio 3BZ was developed by AWA in 1942. Although it had many similarities to the 3B, its receiver had been partially modified and it had a transmitter which had been redesigned to include six crystal channels. It had also been "tropicalised" to protect it against the effects of the moist environment by reducing its susceptibility to mildew, rot and fungus.

The Type 3 set consisted of three main cases containing the transmitter, receiver and speaker. Other parts included the headphones, key, microphone, 6 or 12 volt accumulators, as well as a small petrol charging generator or a pedal generator based on a bicycle frame (often operated using native labour). Often the equipment used by a Coastwatcher would include parts from the 3A, 3B and 3BZ, or whatever other items were locally available to them, yet they were commonly referred to as the "3BZ" regardless of this. Total weight was approximately 100 kilograms (200 lb) including ancillaries, with the generator weighing 30 kilograms (60 lb), while the receiver was 15 kilograms (32 lb). The steel cases of the 3B and 3BZ were 41 centimetres (16 in) wide, 26 centimetres (10 in) high, and 26 centimetres (10 in) deep. Depending on the aerial used, the 3B provided a range of up to 400 kilometres (250 mi).

== Legacy ==
After the war the Australian Signal Officer-in-Chief, Major General Colin Simpson, paid tribute to the spotters, writing that they were "infantrymen without a typical battlefield, artillerymen without field pieces and tank crews without tanks. Apart from a hard core of very talented personnel, all that most spotters had in common was an abysmal ignorance of anything to do with signals. Yet they won the respect of our Allies and every branch of the Australian forces". He continued, stating that "they were dedicated to their duty and they never failed. The New Guinea Air Warning Wireless Company is a Signal unit of which very little has been heard as their duties were top secret at all times. It can be stated that the successful course of the war could have been seriously delayed, if not greatly prolonged, if this signal unit had not operated so efficiently."

Within the Australian Army the role of long range clandestine communications is currently performed by the 301st and 126th Signals Squadrons, which form part of the 1st and 2nd Commando Regiment respectively, and the 152nd Signal Squadron which operates with the Special Air Service Regiment. They trace their lineage back to units such as the Coastwatchers, New Guinea Air Warning Wireless and the "M" and "Z" Special Units. The role pioneered by these and other units during World War II is now known as Special Reconnaissance (SR):

"Special Forces teams are infiltrated behind enemy lines to provide the theater commander with intelligence on the enemy or to gather information on the terrain, local populace, etc. of an area. Verify, through observation or other collection methods, information concerning enemy capabilities, intentions, and activities in support of strategic/operational objectives or conventional forces.

Reconnaissance and surveillance actions conducted at strategic or operational levels to complement national and theater-level collection efforts.

Collect meteorological, hydrographic, geographic, and demographic data; provide target acquisition, area assessment, and post-strike reconnaissance data."

== Commanding officers ==
The following officers commanded the NGAWW:

- Major Donald William Francis Small (1942);
- Captain Thomas Richard Warren (1942–43);
- Captain Gordon Charles Allen King (1943);
- Major Cyril Kevin Guiney (1943–44);
- Major Lennard Wesley Cumpston (1944); and
- Captain John Henry Marsh (1944–45).

== Notes ==
Footnotes

Citations
