= Basil Morris =

Australian general (1888–1975)

Basil Moorhouse Morris
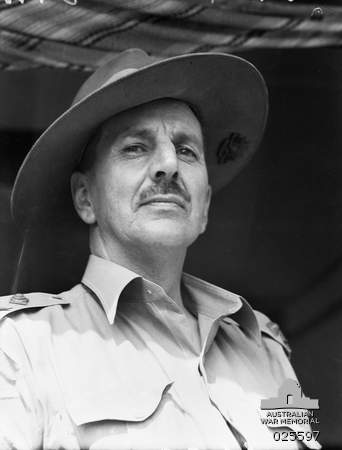
- Major General Basil Morris in Port Moresby, New Guinea, July 1942
- Born: 19 December 1888; East Melbourne, Victoria, Australia
- Died: 5 April 1975 (aged 86); Beaconsfield Upper, Victoria, Australia
- Military career
- Allegiance: Australia
- Branch: Australian Army
- Service years: 1910–1946
- Rank: Major General
- Commands: Australian New Guinea Administrative Unit (1942–46); New Guinea Lines of Communication Area (1942); New Guinea Force (1942); 8th Military District (1941–42); Overseas Base Area (1939–40); 2nd Heavy Artillery Brigade (1927–31); Garrison Artillery, 3rd Military District (1926–29); 2nd Coastal Artillery Brigade (1926–27); Field Artillery, 2nd Military District (1922–24); 114th Howitzer Battery (1918–19)
- Conflicts: First World War; Western Front; Second World War; New Guinea campaign
- Awards: Commander of the Order of the British Empire; Distinguished Service Order; Mentioned in Despatches (4)

Major General Basil Moorhouse Morris, CBE, DSO (19 December 1888 – 5 April 1975) was an Australian Army officer. He served in both the First and Second World Wars. In 1942, he was the Australian military administrator at Port Moresby at the start of the Imperial Japanese advance along the Kokoda Track after the invasion of Buna-Gona and successfully delayed the Japanese advance until units of the Second Australian Imperial Force arrived.

== Early life ==
Basil Morris was born on 19 December 1888 at East Melbourne, Victoria, to William Edward Morris and Clara Elizabeth, née French. Through his mother, he was related to Sir John French, a prominent banker in New South Wales. He was educated at the Melbourne Church of England Grammar School and after finishing school spent a year at the University of Melbourne while in residence at Trinity College. He joined the Melbourne Cavalry and was later commissioned into the Royal Australian Artillery on 1 December 1910. His older brother was Anglican priest William Perry French Morris, who founded Brisbane's Church of England Grammar School in 1912.

== First World War ==
Morris volunteered for the Australian Imperial Force (AIF) after the commencement of the First World War. He was promoted to lieutenant in May 1915 and was posted to 'O' Siege Brigade (soon to be designated 36th (Australian) Heavy Artillery Group). He served on the Western Front from February 1916, firstly with the 55th Battery of the 36th Heavy Artillery Group and then from November 1917 with the headquarters of the 5th Divisional Artillery. Promoted to major, from September 1918 he commanded 114th Howitzer Battery. He participated in the Hundred Days Offensive and for his leadership of his battery during this period he was awarded the Distinguished Service Order. He was also mentioned three times in despatches.

== Interwar period ==
Morris was discharged from the AIF after the war and returned to Australia in 1919. He chose to remain a professional soldier and transferred to the Staff Corps. He held a number of staff positions for the next several years.

== Second World War ==
Morris was promoted to colonel following the outbreak of the Second World War and in November was chosen to command the Australian Overseas Base. He transferred to the 2nd AIF with the rank of temporary brigadier and departed for the Middle East in December. After arriving in Palestine in January 1940, he began establishing the base at Jerusalem after deciding the site originally proposed, Gaza, was too small. In August 1940, Morris was appointed the Australian military liaison officer in Bombay, India and was charged with the responsibility of establishing relations with military authorities in India and Ceylon.

The following year Morris was appointed as the commandant of the 8th Military District, which covered the Australian administered Territory of Papua. Following the entry into the war of the Japanese Empire, he took over the running of the territory and in doing so, came into conflict with the civilian administrator, Hubert Leonard Murray. Murray, along with most of the senior governmental heads, soon left the territory. To replace the civilians who had left, Morris set up the Australian New Guinea Administrative Unit (ANGAU) which would continue to run the territory.

Promoted temporary major general in January 1942, Morris was based at Port Moresby. His available forces, mainly Australian militia, were of poor quality, and he was ill-prepared to deal with the spate of looting by the militia that followed the Japanese air raids on the town in early February 1942. His superior officer (and friend), General Sir Thomas Blamey, later defended Morris from criticism of his handling of the militia during this time.

In June 1942, Morris was queried by General Douglas MacArthur on his plans for defending Kokoda, recognised for its value as an airstrip for the advancing Japanese. Initially relying on patrols by the Papuan Infantry Battalion, he later sent 39th Battalion to guard Kokoda. This proved to be a fortuitous decision as the Japanese began attacking Kokoda in late July.

Morris was not known for his tactical nous and indeed this was partly why he had been made commander of the 8th Military District, a military backwater, in the first place. Much to Morris' relief, in August 1942, Blamey replaced him as commander of Australian forces in New Guinea, which would shortly be expanded by experienced elements of the 2nd AIF recalled from North Africa, with Lieutenant General Sydney Rowell. Morris then took over responsibility for the New Guinea Lines of Communication Area and ANGAU for the rest of the war. In September 1944, while on an inspection tour, he was injured in an Beaufort crash at Cape Gloucester. Suffering a broken arm, he had to be extracted from the wreckage by his chauffeur.

== Later life ==
Morris retired from the army on 19 October 1946 and the following year, in recognition of his services in the Southwest Pacific during the war, was appointed Commander of the Order of the British Empire. He lived at Upper Beaconsfield, Victoria. He stood for the Victorian seat of Gippsland West in the 1947 and 1950 state elections for the Liberal Party, but was unsuccessful both times. He died on 5 April 1975 at Upper Beaconsfield and was cremated. He was survived by his wife, Audrey Lewis Cogan whom he married in 1921, and the couple's five daughters.
