= Edmund Herring =

Australian general and judge (1892–1982)

Lieutenant-General The Honourable Sir Edmund Herring
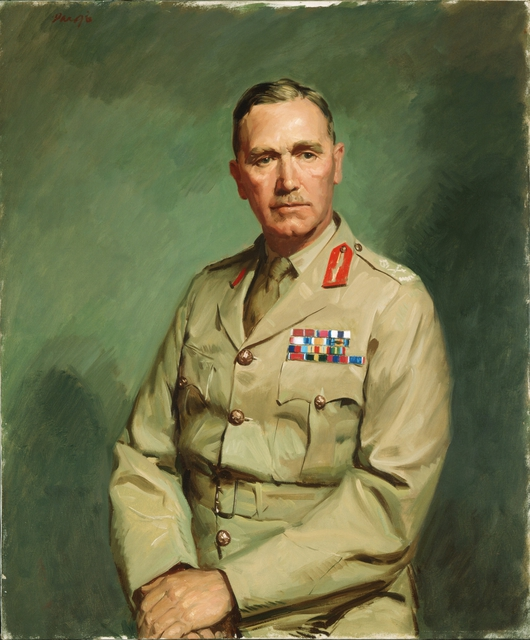
- Portrait of Lieutenant General Sir Edmund Herring (Note: This portrait, by William Dargie, won the Archibald Prize in 1945.)
- Born: 2 September 1892; Maryborough, Victoria Colony
- Died: 5 January 1982 (aged 89); Camberwell, Victoria, Australia
- Spouse: Dame Mary Herring (m. 1922; died 1981)
- Military career
- Allegiance: United Kingdom; Australia
- Branch: British Army (1913–19); Australian Army (1922–51)
- Service years: 1913–1919; 1922–1951
- Rank: Lieutenant General
- Service number: VX15
- Commands: I Corps (1942–44) New Guinea Force (1942–43) II Corps (1942); Northern Territory Force (1942); 7th Military District (1942); 6th Division (1941–42); Royal Artillery, 6th Division (1939–41); 22nd Field Artillery Brigade (1937–39); 4th Field Artillery Brigade (1934–37); 2nd Field Artillery Brigade (1929–34); B Battery, 99th Brigade, Royal Field Artillery (1918–19)
- Conflicts: First World War; Battle of Dorian; Second World War; North African campaign; Western Desert campaign; Battle of Greece; New Guinea campaign; Kokoda Track campaign; Huon Peninsula campaign; Finisterre Range campaign; Operation Cartwheel; Salamaua-Lae campaign
- Awards: Knight Commander of the Order of St Michael and St George; Knight Commander of the Order of the British Empire; Distinguished Service Order; Military Cross; Knight of the Order of St John; Efficiency Decoration; Distinguished Service Cross (United States); War Cross, 1st Class (Greece)
- Other work: Chief Justice of the Supreme Court of Victoria; Lieutenant governor of Victoria

Lieutenant General Sir Edmund Francis Herring, KCMG, KBE, DSO, MC, KStJ, ED, KC (2 September 1892 – 5 January 1982) was a senior Australian Army officer during the Second World War, Lieutenant Governor of Victoria, and Chief Justice of the Supreme Court of Victoria. A Rhodes scholar, Herring was at New College, Oxford, when the First World War broke out and served with the Royal Field Artillery on the Macedonian front, for which he was awarded the Military Cross and Distinguished Service Order. After the war he carved out a successful career as a barrister and King's Counsel. He also joined the Australian Army, rising to the rank of colonel by 1939.

During the Second World War, Herring commanded the 6th Division Artillery in the Western Desert campaign and the Battle of Greece. In 1942, as a corps commander, he commanded the land forces in the Kokoda Track campaign. The following year, he directed operations in the Salamaua-Lae campaign and Finisterre Range campaign. Herring left his corps to become the longest-serving Chief Justice and Lieutenant Governor of Victoria, serving for three decades. In the latter capacity, he was patron of many charitable organisations.

== Education and early life ==
Edmund Francis Herring, known as Ned to his family, was born in Maryborough, Victoria, on 2 September 1892, the third of five children of Edmund Selwyn Herring, a solicitor, and his Irish-born wife Gertrude Stella Herring, formerly Fetherstonhaugh. He was educated at Maryborough College and High School and at Melbourne Grammar, where he excelled at tennis and cricket, and was both School Captain and Dux in 1910. While at Melbourne Grammar, he served in the Commonwealth Cadet Corps, reaching the rank of sergeant.

In 1911, Herring entered Trinity College, the Church of England residential college at the University of Melbourne, where he played cricket and tennis. In 1912, he won a Rhodes Scholarship to the University of Oxford in England. There, he joined the Officers Training Corps in 1913. In November of that year he enlisted as a trooper in King Edward's Horse, a cavalry unit in the British Army.

== First World War ==
King Edward's Horse was mobilised in August 1914, but was not immediately sent overseas. In December 1914, Herring was commissioned as a second lieutenant in the Royal Field Artillery, and was posted to B Battery, 99th Field Artillery Brigade of the British 22nd Division. The division moved to the Western Front in August 1915, but was there only a month before being transferred to the Macedonian front, where it served for the rest of the war.

In the Battle of Doiran in April 1917, Herring served as an artillery observer, directing artillery fire in support of the 22nd Division's attack from a front line observation post on Pip Ridge. There was a furious artillery duel. Twenty minutes after Captain Thomas Winwood took Herring's place as forward observer, the observation post took a direct hit from an enemy shell, killing Winwood. Herring succeeded Winwood as battery captain, and was promoted to acting captain in April 1917. For his courage under heavy shellfire, Herring received an immediate award of the Military Cross (MC), the citation for which reads:

For conspicuous gallantry and devotion to duty. As F[orward].O[bservation].O[fficer]. throughout the operations he carried on in very exposed positions under heavy shell fire. His information proved of the utmost value.

After three years' service, Herring was granted three weeks' leave in Australia in October 1917. He returned to Maryborough, where he met Mary Ranken Lyle, the daughter of the mathematical physicist Thomas Lyle, then a medical student at the University of Melbourne, on New Year's Day 1918. The two became constant companions and agreed to correspond regularly.

Herring departed for Salonika in February, returning to duty there in March 1918, and was promoted to acting major on 24 October 1918 on assuming command of B Battery, 99th Field Artillery Brigade. For his service as a battery commander, he was awarded the Distinguished Service Order. He reverted to lieutenant on ceasing to command the battery on 22 January 1919.

== Between the wars ==
When the war ended, Herring wished to return to Australia and see Mary before resuming his studies at the University of Oxford in October 1919. Mary wrote back pointing out the impracticality of this idea; though she would be disappointed not to see him, he should remain in England and complete his course at Oxford first. The university had awarded him a wartime Bachelor of Arts (BA) degree in 1915; the Rhodes Scholarship Trust allowed him to resume his scholarship, and he studied for a Bachelor of Civil Law (BCL) degree. Since it had been five years since he had been awarded his BA, he was entitled to a MA as well, and graduated with both degrees in July 1920. After a holiday in Britain and France with his sister Kathleen, he arrived back in Melbourne on 26 November 1920.

Herring was admitted to practice in Victoria as a barrister and solicitor on 1 March 1921 and signed the roll of counsel of the Victorian Bar on 8 June of that year; Mary graduated with her Bachelor of Medicine and Surgery (MB BS) and became a resident surgeon at Royal Melbourne Hospital. The two were married on 6 April 1922, and had three daughters, Mary Cecile (Molly), born in 1924, Judith Ann (Judy), born in 1926, and Margaret Lyle, born in 1933. Herring worked as a barrister, and lectured in law at the University of Melbourne. He became a King's Counsel on 25 February 1936. Mary worked as a physician at antenatal clinics.

Herring joined the Australian Army on 1 October 1922 as a legal staff officer in the part-time militia, with the rank of captain. On 1 August 1923 he transferred to Australian Field Artillery. He was promoted to major on 1 July 1925, lieutenant colonel on 1 July 1929, and temporary colonel on 1 August 1939, commanding the 3rd Division Artillery.

Herring was involved in politics throughout the 1930s. He was elected to the Melbourne Club in 1927, a year before Sir Thomas Lyle became its president. He joined the Young Nationalists, an organisation founded by Robert Menzies and Wilfrid Kent Hughes. Along with many senior army and ex-army officers, he was also a member of the clandestine far-right wing paramilitary organisation known as the White Guard, White Army or League of National Security. Composed primarily of former soldiers, the White Guard saw themselves as defenders of order who stood ready to stop a Catholic or Communist revolution in the wake of an emergency like the 1923 Victorian Police strike. After failing to gain United Australia Party preselection for the Victorian Legislative Assembly seat of Prahran in 1931, he ran as an unendorsed candidate (i.e. one lacking formal political endorsement) for the seat of Brighton in 1936. He gained 12,258 votes, losing by just 528. Herring also joined the Christian service organisation Toc H in 1925 and became its Victorian Area Commissioner in 1936.

== Second World War ==
On 6 October 1939, Herring was informed that Major General Sir Thomas Blamey had decided to appoint him as Commander, Royal Artillery, of the 6th Division, of the new Second Australian Imperial Force (AIF) being raised for service overseas. A week later, Herring was promoted to substantive colonel and temporary brigadier, and given the AIF serial number VX15. His first task was to organise his new command, which was equipped with World War I vintage 18 pounder guns and 4.5 inch howitzers. Herring left for Palestine on 15 April 1940, along with the 6th Division's commander, Major General Iven Mackay and his headquarters. Training was difficult as the old ammunition was in short supply. His command was only partially reequipped with the new 25 pounders before being committed to the Western Desert campaign in December 1940.

=== Western desert ===
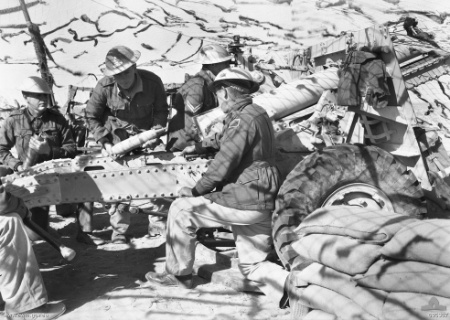
25-pounder gun crew of the 2/1st Field Artillery Regiment at Bardia

At the Battle of Bardia, Herring controlled all 120 guns used in the division's attack, in which the infantry were supported by Great-War-style barrages. After the victory at Bardia, Herring's gunners supported the attack on Tobruk. More than half of his guns were British, and some were commanded by regular British officers who were sceptical of the ability of an Australian Militia officer. War Correspondent Chester Wilmot noted that:

Herring has a quiet, easy manner and his last war service has given him an understanding of the British to which they were quick to respond. After Bardia and Tobruk those officers who had been most skeptical were his strongest champions. In building up the artillery plan, Herring brought to bear the same thorough, relentless logic and attention to detail with which he had so often built up a legal argument.

=== Greece ===
In the campaign in Greece, Herring had, as well as his own gunners, the 2nd Regiment, Royal Horse Artillery, 64th Medium Regiment, Royal Artillery and, for a time, the 6th Field Regiment, Royal New Zealand Artillery, under his command. His Australian, New Zealand and British gunners demonstrated "the extent to which, in such rugged country, artillery, with reliable infantry ahead, could halt and confuse a pursuer" but they were unable to stop the enemy advance.

Herring was ordered to evacuate from Greece. He was one of between 7,000 and 8,000 troops that gathered at Nafplion on 24 April 1941, although transportation had been arranged for only 5,000. The ship that he was to sail on, the Ulster Prince ran aground near the harbour entrance. She was refloated but then ran aground again near the wharf. Despite this, some 6,600 men and women were embarked. Herring and fellow Brigadier Clive Steele were among 5,100 that managed to reach Crete on the Royal Navy transport HMS Glenearn. From there they flew back to Alexandria. Others were transported by HMS Phoebe, HMS Hyacinth, HMAS Stuart and HMAS Voyager, which carried 150 Australian and New Zealand nurses. For his service in Libya and Greece, Herring was made a Commander of the Order of the British Empire (CBE).

=== Defence of Australia ===
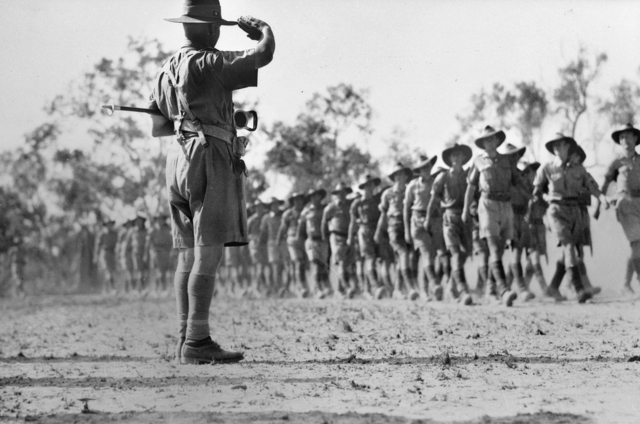
Members of the 6th Division march past Major General Herring at Darwin during 1942

Herring was promoted to the temporary rank of major general on 14 August 1941 when he took over command of the 6th Division. He returned to Australia with it in March 1942. Unaware that the government had already decided that General Sir Thomas Blamey should be appointed Commander in Chief, Herring, along with Major General George Alan Vasey and Brigadier Clive Steele, approached Army Minister Frank Forde with a proposal that all officers over the age of 50 be immediately retired and Major General Horace Robertson appointed Commander in Chief. The 'revolt of the generals' collapsed with the announcement that General Blamey was returning from the Middle East to become Commander in Chief, but seems to have done the participants no harm.

In Blamey's reorganisation of the Army in April 1942, Herring was given command of Northern Territory Force. At this time Darwin was being subjected to Japanese air raids. As supply by sea or air was impractical, Herring developed a land line of communications running across the outback from Alice Springs.

On 14 August 1942, Herring was ordered to Esk, Queensland, to assume command of II Corps with the temporary rank of lieutenant general. As such, he was responsible for the defence of Brisbane. At this time he was criticised in Federal Parliament by Arthur Calwell for allegedly issuing a verbal order while commander of the 6th Division that no officer was to be commissioned unless they had at least attained an Intermediate Certificate. There was no evidence that such an order was ever issued, but the allegation reflected a suspicion that Herring was an elitist.

=== Papuan campaign ===
In the wake of the dismissal of Lieutenant General Sydney Rowell for insubordination, Blamey ordered Herring to join him in Port Moresby as the new commander of I Corps. Before departing, Herring met with General Douglas MacArthur, who emphasised that the first duty of a soldier was obedience to his superiors.

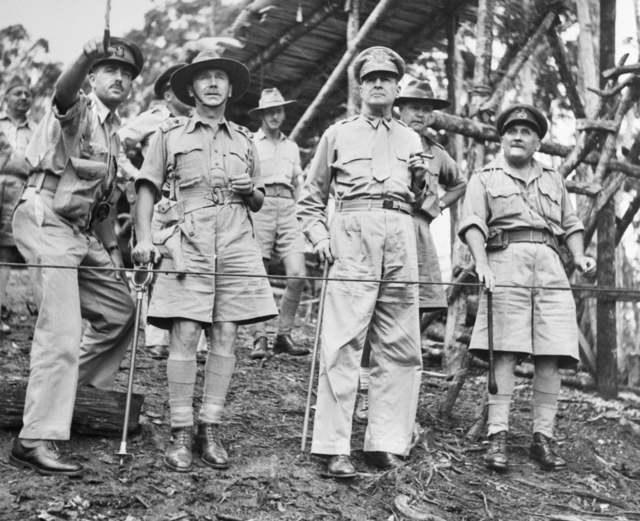
Herring (second from left) in Papua in October 1942 with General Douglas MacArthur (centre) and Major General Arthur Samuel Allen (right)

As at Darwin, Herring's primary difficulty was logistics. The troops on the Kokoda Track had to be supplied from Port Moresby either by air or by Papuan native carriers who lugged stores over the track on their backs. MacArthur created the Combined Operation Service Command (COSC), an unusual combined Australian-American logistical organisation, under U.S. Brigadier General Dwight Johns, who in turn was answerable to Herring. Herring backed a plan to take American engineers off working on the airstrips to develop the port by building a causeway to Tatana Island, the successful completion of which doubled the port's capacity and was the logistical turning point of the campaign.

More controversial was Herring's relief of Brigadier Arnold Potts and Blamey's of Major General Arthur Samuel Allen at Herring's urging. Herring acknowledged that the two men had faced a difficult task but felt that they were tired and that Brigadier Ivan Dougherty and Major General Vasey could do better. Supporters of Allen, who left school at age 14, saw this as the action of an autocratic elitist who "ran his staff as he had controlled junior counsel in his barrister's chamber; they did his bidding, his way, or were forthwith dispensed with".

In a letter to Herring in 1959, General Robert L. Eichelberger (who had himself relieved two division commanders – Major Generals Edwin F. Harding and Horace H. Fuller) had this to say about the matter:

It is a funny thing about war historians. If a general dismisses a subordinate at any time he is immediately attacked; whereas in our football game, if you have a better player for a particular place, you always play him, and everybody expects you to do this. I have little doubt that the same is true of your ball game. War historians never seem to give generals credit for having thought that X might be better than Y for the next phase of operations.

In November, Herring flew across the mountains to take control of the fighting around Buna, leaving Blamey to control operations elsewhere in New Guinea. Herring planned the systematic reduction of the Japanese positions at Buna and Sanananda. He struggled to amass enough troops, equipment, guns, and supplies to allow Australian troops under Vasey and Americans under Eichelberger to overcome the Japanese and capture the area.

=== New Guinea campaign ===
Following the victory at Buna, for which Herring and Eichelberger were appointed Knights Commander of the Order of the British Empire, Blamey ordered him to return to Australia for a rest. While in Melbourne, Herring had an attack of malaria, but recovered to resume command in New Guinea in May. Blamey charged him with responsibility for the next phase of Operation Cartwheel, the capture of Lae. Herring would command I Corps, which would be part of New Guinea Force, under Blamey and later Mackay. Blamey intended to have Lieutenant General Leslie Morshead command the subsequent phase of the operation, the assault on Madang.

At this time operations were in train to drive the Japanese back to Salamaua. Once again, the difficulties of supplying the attacking force were formidable. Out of sensitivity towards the sensibilities of the Americans, Herring left the command arrangements between Major General Stanley Savige's 3rd Division and units of the American 41st Infantry Division ambiguous. This backfired, producing acrimony between the Australian and American commanders. Herring prepared to fire Savige, but an investigation by Major General Frank Berryman determined that the dispute was not Savige's fault.

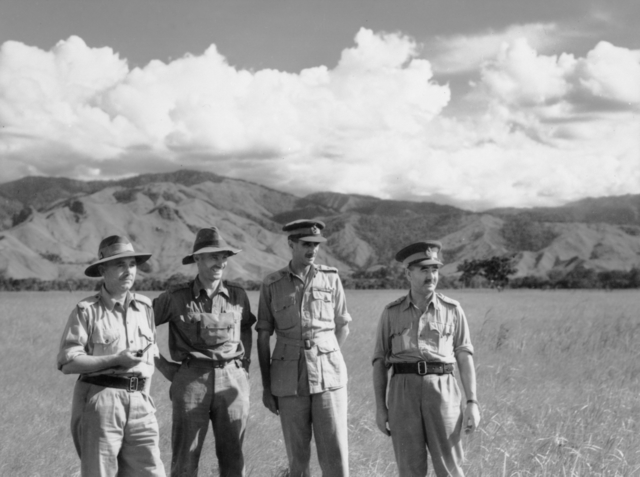
Herring (left) with other senior Australian officers in the Ramu Valley of New Guinea in October 1943

The new offensive, which opened on 5 September 1943 with the 7th Division landing at Nadzab by air and 9th Division landing at Lae from the ships of Rear Admiral Daniel E. Barbey's VII Amphibious Force, saw the rapid capture of Lae. While the 7th Division moved up the Markham and Ramu Valleys, the 9th Division made another landing at Scarlet Beach near Finschhafen. The timing of the landing was contentious; Barbey, who feared air attack, wanted to land at night while Herring held out for a dawn landing, threatening to take the issue to General MacArthur. Eventually Berryman managed to persuade Herring to accept a compromise H-hour in the darkness before dawn. The U.S. Naval Historian Samuel Eliot Morison noted: "The Australians proved to be right; 'Uncle Dan's' outfit was not prepared for a neat night landing. The usual SNAFU developed." But Berryman saw Herring as being uncooperative, and his intransigence as a sign of battle weariness.

In the subsequent Battle of Finschhafen, it soon became clear that the strength of the Japanese forces there had been seriously underestimated, and the 9th Division needed to be resupplied and reinforced, and its casualties evacuated. Herring strove to get the necessary amphibious lift from the navy but the commander of the United States Seventh Fleet, Vice Admiral Arthur S. Carpender, was reluctant to expose his ships to the Japanese air threat. The matter went up the chain of command to Mackay, to Blamey, and ultimately to MacArthur, who could do little, given that he had no real authority over the U.S. Navy.

Carpender was not inflexible, and reached a compromise with Mackay to transport a battalion to Finschhafen in high speed transports (APDs). Herring was in Dobodura, lunching with Lieutenant General Brehon B. Somervell, when he heard this news. He decided to fly to Milne Bay to discuss the matter of resupply in general with Barbey. On 28 September, Herring and two of his staff officers, Brigadiers R. B. Sutherland and R. Bierwirth, boarded a U.S. Fifth Air Force B-25 Mitchell bomber at Dobodura. As the plane was about to take off, the undercarriage collapsed and the plane ploughed into the Marston Mat runway. A propeller shattered, splinters ripped through the fuselage into the cabin and Sutherland, who was sitting in the navigator's compartment next to Herring, was struck by a flying fragment that killed him instantly. The crew, Herring and Bierwirth escaped shaken but unscathed. The trip to Milne Bay was cancelled. Brigadier Sutherland was buried with full military honours at Soputa the next day, with a fly past by B-25s. When next he flew, Herring once again took a B-25 and made a point of requesting the major who had been in charge of the crashed plane to be his pilot.

Mackay became convinced that Herring was becoming increasingly difficult to work with as a result of stress and fatigue and asked Blamey for permission to relieve him. Blamey's response was characteristic: Morshead would be on the next plane. Yet Blamey maintained his faith in Herring, who retained command of I Corps on the Atherton Tableland, where he trained his men for the next operation. He did not know when or where this would be, so he focused on amphibious warfare. He created the 1st Beach Group and developed tactics and doctrine for amphibious operations based on his own experience in the New Guinea Campaign and reports from the Allied invasion of Sicily. The benefits of his work would be realised in the Borneo Campaign.

== Chief Justiceship and later life ==
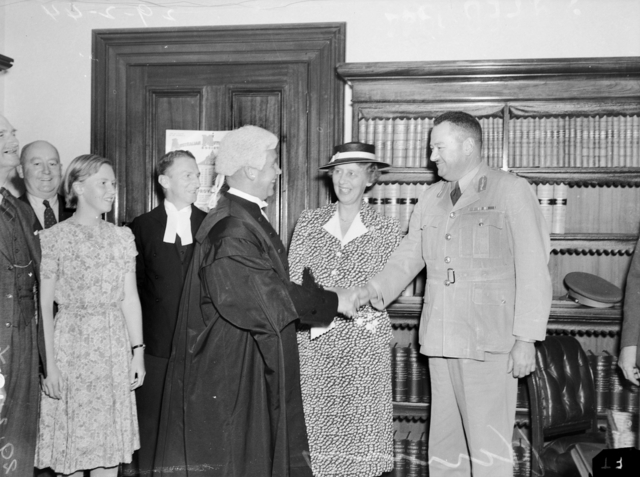
Lady Herring (with hat) looks on as Sir Edmund Herring, the new Chief Justice of Victoria, greets guests at an informal reception in his rooms. Major General C. E. M. Lloyd, Adjutant General, congratulates Herring on his appointment.

On 2 February 1944, the Victorian government decided to appoint Herring as Chief Justice of the Supreme Court of Victoria. Blamey advised the Prime Minister that:

General Herring is prepared to accept the appointment and I recommend he be released from the Army. He has had two serious attacks of Malaria. I am afraid that in view of his age, further tropical service may seriously injure his health and that the command may suffer as a result. He has rendered excellent service over four years, mainly on active service in the field.

It was not quite the end of his military service. Herring was recalled to duty for a year as Director General of Recruiting in August 1950 when the Korean War spurred efforts to build up the Army again. In January 1953, Herring was selected as leader of the Australian Services Contingent for the coronation of Queen Elizabeth II. This saw Australian soldiers as the Queen's Guard at Buckingham Palace on 26 May 1953, Herring personally taking part in the procession. On 10 July, he was made a Knight of the Order of St John at Buckingham Palace. At the same time, Mary was made a commander of the same order for her charity work.

Herring maintained connections with his comrades from both World Wars. On the way back from the coronation, the Herrings stayed with the Eichelbergers in Asheville, North Carolina. The two generals remained close friends, exchanging regular letters until Eichelberger's death in 1961. In 1962, Herring visited Richard O'Connor at his home in Ross. In 1967 and 1971, the Herrings again travelled to America where they were guests of Dwight Johns and his wife. In 1973, he visited Washington, D.C. for the annual reunion of MacArthur's staff, and resolved that the next reunion should be held in Australia. He obtained government backing for his idea, and arranged for more than twenty former American generals, including Leif J. Sverdrup, Hugh John Casey, William C. Chase and Clyde D. Eddleman and their wives, to visit Australia in 1974, with commemorative functions being held in Melbourne, Sydney and Brisbane. Herring steadfastly believed that MacArthur, like Blamey, was a great commander who was not fully appreciated in his own country.

Herring's twenty years as Chief Justice was a period of significant change and growth in the administration of the law. During his term of office the number of judges on the Court increased from six to fourteen, reflecting the growth in cases. Herring earned a reputation as a fine judge and able administrator. He set up the Chief Justice's Law Reform Committee to try to ensure justice in Victoria's courts was abreast of the times, and a committee for religious observances and services to arrange the religious services marking the opening of the legal year. Herring retired as Chief Justice in 1964 but stayed on as Lieutenant Governor until his 80th birthday in 1972, serving in the position for a record 27 years. For his service as Lieutenant Governor, Herring was made a Knight Commander of the Order of St Michael and St George in the King's Birthday Honours of 9 June 1949.

In a speech given on the occasion of his retiring as Chief Justice of Victoria, Herring said:

And now the time has come for me to lay down my office, but before I do so there are two matters to which I feel bound to draw attention. The first is this, that under the Australian constitution the great common law courts of Australia are the Supreme Courts of the States. Federal Parliament has no power to set up common law courts and so it is to the Supreme Courts of the States the citizen must look for protection from illegal arrest and other encroachments on his liberty. It is to these Courts that he must come for a writ of habeas corpus. These Courts and their prestige must, therefore, at all costs be sustained so that they will continue to attract the finest characters and best legal brains that we can produce. As a community we will pay heavily if we allow our Supreme Court to be relegated to a position of inferiority. The second matter I feel I should mention is that the principle of the independence of the judiciary from the executive is fundamental to our freedom. What happens when this principle is departed from is evident from what is going on in many lands today. We must see to it that our citizens all understand that an independent judiciary is the greatest bulwark of their liberties and their best protection from totalitarian rule.

While opening the Victorian Returned Services League Conference shortly before his retirement as Lieutenant Governor, Herring criticised anti-war protesters and praised Australian soldiers who had served in the Vietnam War. "People who throw stones at Americans," he said, "should stop and think where we would have been in 1942 without the Americans." Such remarks earned him a rebuke from the then acting State Opposition Leader, Frank Wilkes, as "untactful" for a representative of the Crown.

Herring again became the subject of controversy in May 1978 when Barry Jones revealed in Federal Parliament that during the Second World War Herring had confirmed death sentences on 22 Papuans convicted of handing over seven Anglican missionaries to the Japanese, which Jones called "the darkest secret in modern Australian history". The Papuans had been convicted of offences including murder and treason. Herring claimed that they had been treated fairly under the conventions and circumstances applicable in wartime. "I have a clear conscience about it", he said. The seven missionaries had all been murdered by the Japanese. Four of them were women who had been raped as well. The Papuans had also handed over to the Japanese for execution two planters, six Australian soldiers, and two American airmen, and they had murdered Australian soldiers of the 39th Infantry Battalion near Kokoda. They were handed over to ANGAU, which had carried out the executions at Higaturu in September 1943.

Herring was president of the Boy Scouts' Association of Victoria for 23 years, and was later the first president of the Australian Boy Scouts' Association from 1959 to 1977. He was chairman of trustees of the Shrine of Remembrance from 1945 to 1978 (and remained a trustee until his death) and chairman of trustees of the Australian War Memorial from 1959 to 1974. He was Honorary Colonel of Melbourne University Regiment for 33 years from 1948 until his death. He was made a fellow of New College, Oxford, in 1949, received an honorary DCL from Oxford in 1953, became an honorary bencher of the Inner Temple in 1963 and received an honorary LLD from Monash University in 1973. He was also active in the Anglican Church, and for many years was chancellor of the diocese of Melbourne, the highest church office that could be held by a layman. In 1980 he was elected one of the inaugural fellows of Trinity College, Melbourne, under its new constitution.

== Death and legacy ==
Herring died at a Camberwell, Victoria, nursing home on 5 January 1982. He was given a state funeral at St Paul's Cathedral, Melbourne, planned by his wife, Dame Mary Ranken Herring, who had died three months before.

Victoria's Herring Island is named after him; it is beside the Monash Freeway (named for Herring's fellow "citizen soldier", general and lawyer, Sir John Monash) in Melbourne's Yarra River at South Yarra, approximately 3 kilometres (1.9 mi) from the city. Herring's wartime portraits are in the Australian War Memorial in Canberra, which featured him as one of the fifty most prominent Australians with a military background. His papers are in the State Library of Victoria.

== Citations ==
Military offices
Preceded by Lieutenant General Sydney Rowell	GOC I Corps; 1942–1944	Succeeded by Lieutenant General Stanley Savige
Preceded by Lieutenant General Sydney Rowell	GOC New Guinea Force; 1942–1943	Succeeded by Lieutenant General Sir Iven Mackay
Preceded by Lieutenant General John Northcott	GOC II Corps; 1942	Succeeded by Lieutenant General Sir Leslie Morshead
Legal offices
Preceded by Sir Frederick Mann	Chief Justice of the Supreme Court of Victoria; 1944–1964	Succeeded by Sir Henry Winneke
Government offices
Preceded by Sir Frederick Mann	Lieutenant-Governor of Victoria; 1945–1972	Succeeded by Sir Henry Winneke
