= New Guinea Force =

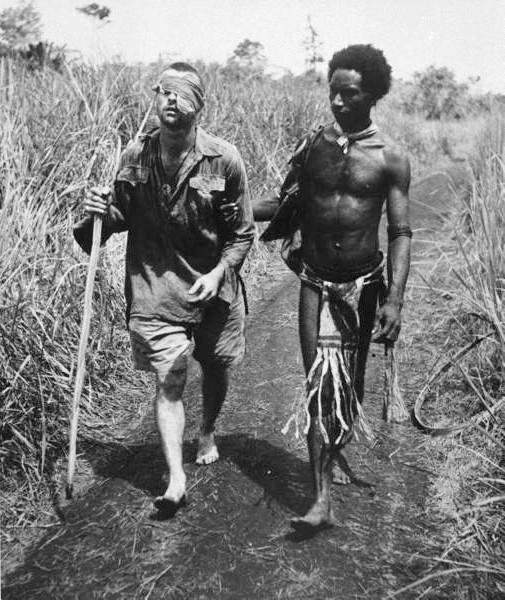
- An Australian soldier, Private George "Dick" Whittington, is aided by Papuan orderly Raphael Oimbari, near Buna on 25 December 1942. (Note: Whittington died in February 1943 from the effects of scrub typhus. (Picture by George Silk, AWM104028 collection reference number.))
- Active: 1942–1944
- Country: Australia
- Allegiance: Australia / Allied Forces
- Branch: Australian Army
- Type: Corps
- Role: I Corps
- Part of: First Australian Army
- Engagements: World War II: Battle of Milne Bay; Kokoda Track campaign; Battle of Buna-Gona; Battle of Wau; Landing at Nadzab; Landing at Lae; Salamaua-Lae campaign

Commanders
- Notable commanders: Sir Thomas Blamey; Sir Leslie Morshead; Sir Edmund Herring

New Guinea Force was a military command unit for Australian, United States and native troops from the Territories of Papua and New Guinea serving in the New Guinea campaign during World War II. Formed in April 1942, when the Australian First Army was formed from the Australian I Corps after it returned from the Middle East, it was responsible for planning and directing all operations within the territory up until October 1944. General Headquarters Southwest Pacific Area Operational Instruction No.7 of 25 May 1942, issued by Commander-Allied-Forces, General Douglas MacArthur, placed all Australian and US Army, Air Force and Navy Forces in the Port Moresby Area under the control of New Guinea Force. Over the course of its existence, New Guinea Force was commanded by some of the Australian Army's most notable commanders, including Sydney Rowell, Sir Edmund Herring and Sir Leslie Morshead.

General Sir Thomas Blamey also commanded the force in 1942 while based in Port Moresby.

== History ==
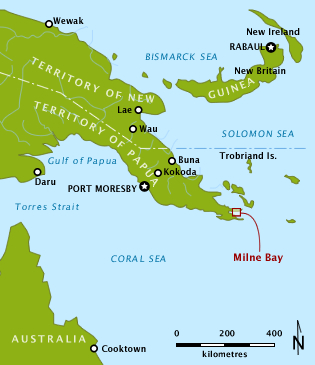
The 8th Military District, showing the Territory of Papua and the Territory of New Guinea (including the New Hebrides)

At the outbreak of hostilities, Australia did not have forces in place for the defence of New Guinea and the New Hebrides, due to the League of Nations mandate under which the former German territories were administered. Small, mostly ad hoc units of lightly trained men were spread across the region. The Australian Government made the decision to move small units to strategic locations to assist the defence. This included elements of the 7th Division, consisting mainly of men from the 2/6th Field Company, on the transport Orcades, who were sent to Java, and fought alongside Dutch forces there, but like most other minor garrisons were soon overwhelmed.

Prior to the formation of New Guinea Force, in January 1942, the 30th Brigade was deployed to New Guinea arriving on the troopship RMS Aquitania, with the 39th and 53rd Infantry Battalions, and took command of the 49th Infantry Battalion. Initially, all Australian forces in New Guinea had been part of the 8th Military District; however, in April 1942, an Army-wide reorganisation was undertaken which saw the establishment of a new command – New Guinea Force – with Major General Basil Morris in command. This force subsequently replaced the 8th Military District as the formation responsible for all Australian forces in the territories of Papua and New Guinea.

In August 1942, HQ I Corps was transferred from Queensland to Port Moresby and on 15 August 1942 became known as Headquarters New Guinea Force (HQ NG Force). Corps troops and two brigades of 7th Division subsequently moved in.

Upon arrival, the 21st Brigade, under Brigadier Arnold Potts, was dispatched to Port Moresby, from where they would help reinforce the 39th Battalion, which were fighting a rearguard action on the Kokoda Track. Around the same time, the 18th Brigade, under the command of Brigadier George Wootten, was sent to Milne Bay, to reinforce the 7th Brigade, which was defending the airfield at the eastern tip of Papua, supported by the Royal Australian Air Force and US engineers. The fighting which followed came to be known as the Battle of Milne Bay.

Further formations from I Corps were rotated through the New Guinea theatre of operations under the command of New Guinea Force:

- In April 1942, the 3rd Division had been assigned to the Australian I Corps, and in early 1943 the 3rd Division arrived in New Guinea, with the 15th Brigade being sent to Port Moresby and the 4th Brigade going to Milne Bay.
- In August 1943, the 5th Division arrived in New Guinea with the 29th Brigade. The 4th Brigade of the 3rd Division was reassigned to the 5th Division and was later replaced within the division by the 29th Brigade.
- From January to May 1944, the brigades of the 7th Division returned to Australia.
- In August 1944, the 3rd Division's brigades were withdrawn back to Australia and assigned to the Australian II Corps.

== Major engagements ==
The subsequent major engagements were fought by units under New Guinea Force:

Milne Bay: August – September 1942

While Australian forces were fighting a rearguard action on the Kokoda Track to prevent the Japanese from reaching Port Moresby, the 4th Brigade of the 3rd Division was sent to Milne Bay in April 1942 to assist protect and expand the airfield there, in anticipation of the creation of an amphibious force to defend the coastal approaches to Milne Bay and Port Moresby. Construction of the airstrip commenced on 8 June 1942, with Nos. 76 and 75 Squadrons arriving in late July. In late August, a Japanese amphibious force attacked in an effort to capture the airfield, but miscalculated the number of Allied troops and were eventually pushed back into the sea and forced to retreat the following month. This was the first major defeat of Japanese land forces in the region.

Kokoda: July – November 1942

In late-September, 1942, the Australian forces began pushing the Japanese back toward Buna. The retreat of the Japanese forces quickly became a rout, with many falling to starvation, illness and the environment, as well as Australian attacks.

Buna–Gona: November 1942 – January 1943

After a disastrous start by the inexperienced and inadequately trained US 32nd Infantry Division, the advance was restarted by the Australian 7th Division, with Gona falling in December 1942, Buna in January 1943, and Sanananda (between the two larger villages) later that same month.

Wau: January 1943

Despite achieving tactical surprise by approaching from an unexpected direction, after a trek over the mountains from Lae, the Japanese attackers were unable to capture Wau, as the Australian defenders had been greatly reinforced by air.

Salamaua-Lae: April - September 1943

After the successful defence of Wau, which was followed up by an advance towards Mubo, a series of actions followed over the course of several months as the Australian 3rd Division advanced north-east towards Salamaua, including an amphibious landing at Nassau Bay. Keeping up the pressure around Salamaua, in early September they launched an airborne assault on Nadzab (see below), and a seaborne landing near Lae (see below), taking the town with simultaneous drives from the east and north-west. The Salamaua garrison withdrew, and it was captured on 11 September 1943, while Lae fell shortly afterwards on 16 September.

Battle of Mubo: March - July 1943

Landing at Nassau Bay: August 1943

Landing at Nadzab: September 1943

Landing at Lae: September 1943

Overview

== Mission ==
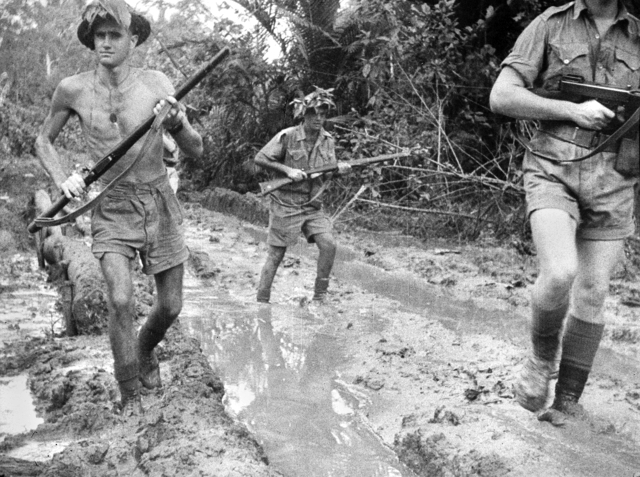
Australian troops at Milne Bay in 1942, shortly after the battle

As per GHQ (Note: General Headquarters) SWPA (Note: South West Pacific Area) Operations Instructions No.15, Section 9, dated 6 August 1942 (reproduced here in full):

9. The mission of the "NEW GUINEA FORCE" is

(a) Protect the operation of Allied Air Forces operating from and through air bases in AUSTRALIAN NEW GUINEA.
(b) Prevent further hostile penetration into AUSTRALIAN NEW GUINEA and in conjunction with the Allied Air Forces, maintain active reconnaissance and deny Japanese use of sea and land areas adjacent to PORT MORESBY, MILNE BAY and the island groups to the north and southeastward of the latter. Prevent at all costs penetration of the Japanese to the southeastward of the crest of the OWEN STANLEY RANGE.
(c) Maintain active patrol operations across the OWEN STANLEY RANGE in the direction of LAE—SALAMAUA and BUNA-GONA. Prepare at the earliest practicable date, assisted by transport and other aviation of the Allied Air Forces, a striking force of at least two battalions eastward of the crest of the OWEN STANLEY RANGE along the route, PORT MORESBY-KOKODA, and capture the KOKODA aerodrome. The eventual objective of this force, upon later orders from this headquarters, in conjunction with other forces is to capture the BUNA-GONA area. Maintain and augment present forces operating from the vicinity of WAU and BULOLO, continue harassing attacks against and be prepared in conjunction with other forces, on later orders from this headquarters, to assist in the capture of LAE and SALAMAUA.
(d) Develop at the earliest practicable date in the vicinity of MILNE BAY an amphibious force, equipped with small boats, for coastwise operations. With the amphibious force and overland detachment, and in conjunction with Allied Air Forces, operate along the northeast coast of NEW GUINEA with the objective of securing the coast line from EAST CAPE to TUFI inclusive and be prepared, in conjunction with other forces upon later orders from this headquarters, to assist in the capture of the BUNA-GONA area.

== Order of battle ==
Over the course of the force's existence, its order of battle changed a number of times as various divisions and brigades were force assigned or reallocated. The following units were attached at various times:

Headquarters – Port Moresby

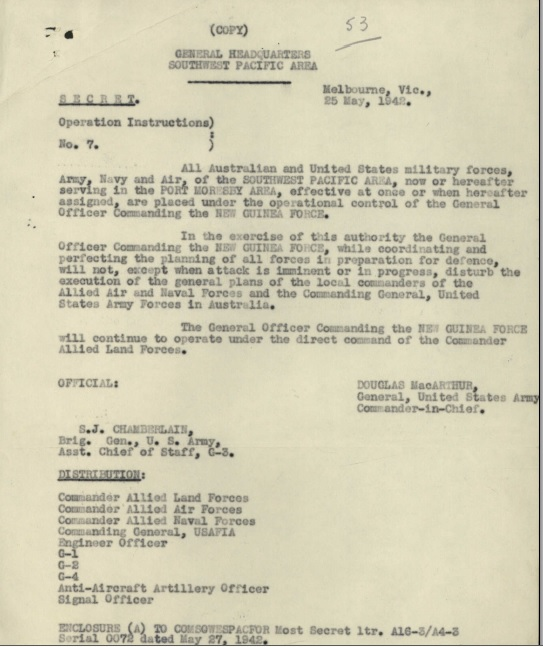
GHQ Southwest Pacific Area Operational Instruction No.7

8th Military District – Rabaul, New Hebrides and New Guinea

- 49th Infantry Battalion – Port Moresby, Papua (Note: The 49th Battalion was based in Port Moresby from March 1941. It was placed under command of the 30th Brigade in January 1942 before being disbanded due to reduction in strength on 3 July 1943.)
- Papuan Infantry Battalion – Port Moresby, Papua
- The New Guinea Volunteer Rifles – Rabaul and New Guinea

January 1942 – 30th Brigade

- Infantry units
  - 39th Infantry Battalion
  - 53rd Infantry Battalion

June 1942 - Maroubra Force

September 1942 – Torres Strait Force

- Units included -
  - Torres Strait Light Infantry Battalion
  - 5th Machine Gun Battalion.

August 1942 – May 1944 – 7th Division

- Infantry units
  - 18th Australian Infantry Brigade
  - 21st Australian Infantry Brigade
  - 25th Australian Infantry Brigade

Early 1943 – August 1944 – 3rd Division (Note: The 3rd Division initially moved to New Guinea composed of the 4th and 15th Brigades. These brigades were sent to Milne Bay and Port Moresby respectively, and Kanga Force (predominantly the 17th Brigade) was placed into the division.)

- Infantry units
  - 4th Australian Infantry Brigade later replaced by the 29th Infantry Brigade
  - 15th Australian Infantry Brigade
  - 17th Australian Infantry Brigade and Kanga Force from April 1943

August 1943 – 5th Division

- 29th Australian Infantry Brigade.

The divisions assigned to New Guinea Force at the end of hostilities were:

- 3rd Division composed of Kanga Force including the 17th Brigade.
- 5th Division composed of the 4th and 29th Brigades.
- 11th Division composed of the 7th and 15th Brigades.

== Notable units ==
- New Guinea Air Warning Wireless – the most highly decorated signals unit of World War II
- 39th Battalion – Battle of Kokoda
- 75 Squadron – Battle of Milne Bay
- 76 Squadron – Battle of Milne Bay

== Commanders ==
The following officers served as commanding officer of New Guinea Force:

- 9 May 1941 to 31 July 1942: Major General Basil Morris – GOC 8 Military District, then New Guinea Force. Became ANGAU commander after the arrival of I Corps
- 1 August 1942 to 30 September 1942: Lieutenant General Sydney Rowell – GOC I Corps
- 1 October 1942 to 29 January 1943: Lieutenant General Edmund Herring – GOC I Corps and New Guinea Force (Note: During this time, Blamey was in command though Herring was nominally commander)
- 30 January 1943 to 21 May 1943: Lieutenant General Sir Iven Mackay – GOC New Guinea Force (Acting)
- 23 May 1943 to 26 August 1943: Lieutenant General Edmund Herring – GOC I Corps and New Guinea Force
- 28 August 1943 to 19 January 1944: Lieutenant General Sir Iven Mackay (Acting) – GOC New Guinea Force
- 21 January 1944 to 5 May 1944: Lieutenant General Sir Leslie Morshead – GOC New Guinea Force
- 6 May 1944 to 1 October 1944: Lieutenant General Stanley Savige – GOC II Corps and New Guinea Force (Note: II Corps replaced I Corps, assuming the NGF name and role while the existing NGF HQ was broken up.)
- 2 October 1944 to 30 November 1945: Lieutenant General Vernon Sturdee – GOC First Army

== Notes ==
Footnotes

Citations
