= II Corps (Australia) =

Australian Army corps

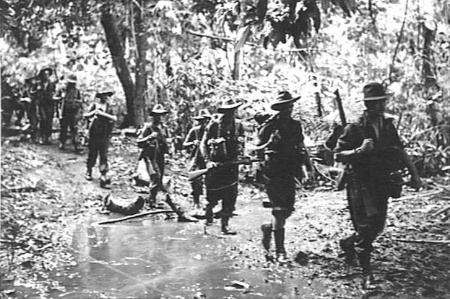
- Australian troops during the Battle of Sio, 1943–1944
- Active: 1942–1945
- Country: Australia
- Branch: Australian Army
- Type: Corps
- Size: Several divisions
- Part of: First Army
- Engagements: World War II: New Guinea campaign; Bougainville campaign; New Britain campaign

Commanders
- Notable commanders: John Northcott

Insignia
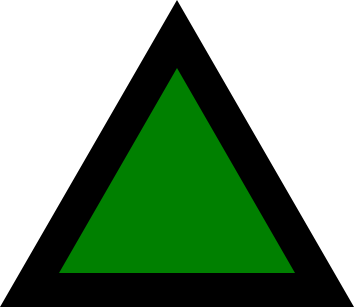
- Unit colour patch

II Corps was an Australian Army corps, one of three that were raised by the Army during the Second World War. Formed in mid-1942 as part of defensive measures to protect the eastern coast of Australia from invasion, the corps was initially composed mainly of home defence troops drawn from the Militia. For a brief period in 1942, a US infantry division was also assigned to the corps prior to its dispatch to fight the Japanese in New Guinea.

After the threat of invasion passed, the corps took more of an operational role and from late 1943 until the end of the war it commanded a mix of Second Australian Imperial Force and Militia units in action against the Japanese in New Guinea and on Bougainville. Following the conclusion of hostilities, the corps headquarters was disbanded in September 1945, and its constituent units transferred to the 3rd Infantry Division.

== History ==
II Corps headquarters was established at Parramatta, New South Wales, in mid-April 1942 from the previously existing Eastern Command (formerly the 2nd Military District) to command Australian Army units deployed to protect the strategically and economically important Sydney–Newcastle–Port Kembla region against a potential invasion. Upon establishment, the corps was assigned to the First Army and was commanded by Lieutenant General John Northcott. It was one of three corps raised by the Army during the war. At the outset, the corps consisted of several Militia formations, including the 1st Infantry Division, Newcastle Covering Force, the 1st Cavalry Division and the 2nd Infantry Division.

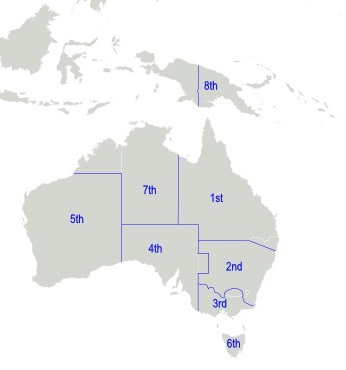
Australian military districts

However, throughout the corps' existence, its composition changed many times. The first change came a couple months after its formation when, in July, the 2nd Infantry Division was transferred to Western Australia, to join III Corps, and II Corps headquarters moved north to Queensland. Initially, it had been planned to move to Gayndah, but the dispatch of the Australian I Corps and the 7th Infantry Division to New Guinea resulted in II Corps headquarters being sent to Esk instead. At this time, the corps gained control of the Australian 3rd Infantry Division and the US 32nd Infantry Division, which were positioned astride the state capital of Brisbane.

There was a change in command in August–September 1942, when Lieutenant General Edmund Herring took over from Northcott as part of a restructuring of the Army. Further changes occurred over the next few months. As the fighting in New Guinea escalated, the 32nd Infantry Division was deployed to the combat zone and II Corps was reduced to only the Australian 3rd Infantry Division and a large number of support troops, including those that had been left behind by I Corps.

The headquarters moved to Mount Mee, Queensland, in December 1942, but this was only short-lived as another move took place the following month, which saw II Corps move to Barrine, Queensland, on the Atherton Tablelands. The area had been selected as the location of a large concentration area for Australian troops to rest and prepare for jungle warfare prior to further offensives, and II Corps was given responsibility for the base area and training programs. Throughout the first half of 1943, all three of the remaining Second Australian Imperial Force infantry divisions moved through the area, with the 7th Infantry Division concentrating around Ravenshoe in February, followed by the 6th and 9th Infantry Division a month later at Wondecla and Kairi respectively.

In the second half of 1943, the Army was reorganised just before the operations to secure Lae. The 7th Infantry Division was sent to Port Moresby in July and the 9th Infantry Division went to Milne Bay. By August 1943, II Corps was under the command of Lieutenant General Leslie Morshead, with its headquarters at Barinne, with the 6th Division (consisting of the 16th and 19th Infantry Brigades), and the 2/7th Cavalry Commando Regiment under its control. Two months later, the corps was committed to an operational role in New Guinea. At this time, the corps headquarters was deployed to Dobodura where it took over from I Corps, and given control of a wide area and a number of divisions, including several in combat: the 7th Infantry Division, which was advancing through the Markham and Ramu Valleys, the 9th Infantry Division on the securing the Huon Peninsula, as well as the Militia 5th and 11th Infantry Divisions, which were undertaking garrison duties in Lae and Buna.

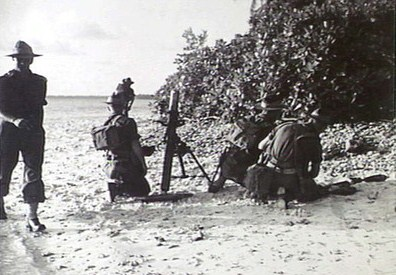
An Australian mortar team during an exercise on Sirot Island, December 1944

In November 1943, Lieutenant General Frank Berryman took over command from Morshead. The politics of this promotion – and the non promotion of the 7th Division's commander, Major General George Vasey, meant that the 7th Division was removed from II Corps and became a direct reporting until under New Guinea Force. Meanwhile, advanced elements of II Corps headquarters moved from Finschhafen, leaving a rear detachment behind at Dobodura. After the Sio was secured, the 9th Infantry Division was withdrawn to Australia for rest in February 1944, while the 5th Infantry Division replaced them around Finschhafen. In April, Madang was captured, effectively bringing large scale combat operations to a close temporarily for Australian forces in New Guinea, and allowing a reorganisation. At this time, the 11th Infantry Division moved from Buna via Lae to relieve the 7th Infantry Division in the Markham and Ramu Valleys.

The same month, the headquarters staff of II Corps were relieved by those from I Corps, with Lieutenant General Stanley Savige arriving from the Atherton Tablelands to assume command. It was a swap of personnel only, with the deployed corps keeping the designation of II Corps. Nevertheless, in May, II Corps headquarters was redesignated as Headquarters New Guinea force when the previous New Guinea Force was disbanded; based in Lae, the formation' main elements were in Madang (5th Infantry Division), and Lae (11th Infantry Division), and the 3rd Infantry Division in the process of arriving.

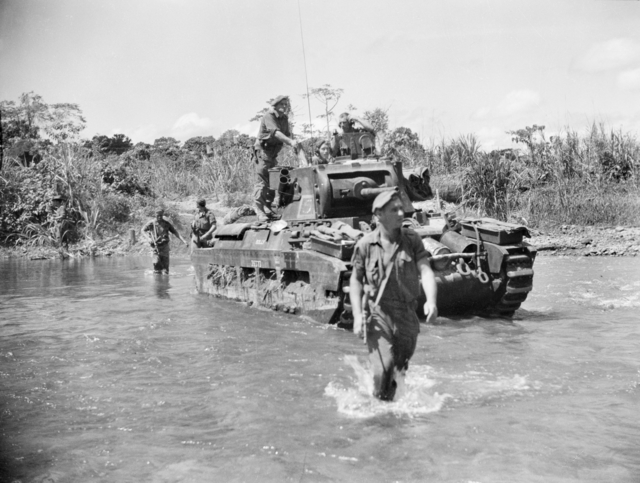
Australian troops, assigned to II Corps, cross the Hongorai River, on Bougainville, May 1945

The final months of 1944 saw the Australians assume responsibility for several rear areas in New Guinea and elsewhere, to relieve US troops and free them up for further offensives in the Philippines. A reorganisation followed as preparations were made for deployments to Bougainville, New Britain and western New Guinea. The headquarters of the First Australian Army was established at Lae with a view to assuming control of all Australian forces in New Guinea. Consequently, the 5th Division became a direct command unit of the First Army for its deployment to New Britain, and Headquarters New Guinea force was redesignated as II Corps in September. II Corps subsequently moved to Torokina, on Bougainville, in November to take over from the US XIV Corps, and to direct the operations of the 3rd Division (consisting of the 7th, 15th and 29th Infantry Brigades), as well as two other brigades – 11th and 23rd, with the later initially detailed to defend the Outer Islands (Green, Emirau, and the Treasury Islands, and Munda, on New Georgia). While the US troops had largely remained in the perimeter that had been established around Torokina, the Australians began offensive operations, to advance south towards the main Japanese base in Buin, to secure Numa Numa in the centre of the island, and push north towards Buka. When the fighting came to an end in mid-August 1945, the Australians were just short of their objective in the south and had made gains in the other two sectors.

Following the cessation of hostilities, II Corps staff took the surrender of Lieutenant General Masatane Kanda's Seventeenth Army on Bougainville, and implemented the terms of surrender throughout August and September. As preparations were made for the post-war draw down of Australia's military, the 23rd Brigade was chosen to remain on Bougainville as a garrison force. On 23 September, the corps commander, Savige, relinquished command to assume the role of Director of Demobilisation and Repatriation in Melbourne. In his stead, Major General William Bridgeford assumed administrative command. The following day, 24 September, II Corps headquarters closed. The formation's constituent units were then transferred to the direct command of the 3rd Infantry Division. In the post war period, no corps-level formations have been raised by the Australian Army.

== Order of battle ==
Upon establishment, the following formations assigned to II Corps:

- 1st Infantry Division
- Newcastle Covering Force
- 1st Cavalry Division
- 2nd Infantry Division

In the final stages of the war, the following formations were assigned to II Corps:

- 3rd Infantry Division
  - 7th Infantry Brigade
  - 15th Infantry Brigade
  - 29th Infantry Brigade
- 11th Infantry Brigade
- 23rd Infantry Brigade
- 317th Light Aid Detachment (Australia)

== Commanders ==
The following officers commanded II Corps during the war:

- Lieutenant General John Northcott
- Lieutenant General Edmund Herring
- Lieutenant General Leslie Morshead
- Lieutenant General Frank Berryman
- Lieutenant General Stanley Savige
