= John Northcott =

Australian general (1890–1966)

Lieutenant General Sir John Northcott KCMG, KCVO, CB, KStJ
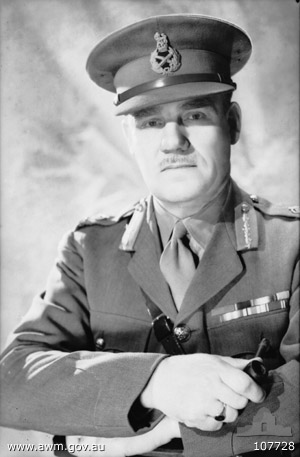
- Northcott in 1944

30th Governor of New South Wales
- In office 1 August 1946 – 3 July 1957
- Monarchs: George VI (1946–52); Elizabeth II (1952–57)
- Premier: William McKell (1946–47); James McGirr (1947–52); Joseph Cahill (1952–59)
- Lieutenant: Sir Frederick Jordan; Sir Kenneth Street
- Preceded by: The Lord Wakehurst
- Succeeded by: Sir Eric Woodward

Personal details
- Born: 24 March 1890 Creswick, Victoria
- Died: 4 August 1966 (aged 76) Wahroonga, New South Wales
- Resting place: Northern Suburbs Memorial Gardens
- Spouse: Winifred Mary

Military service
- Allegiance: Australia
- Branch/service: Australian Army
- Years of service: 1908–1946
- Rank: Lieutenant General
- Commands: British Commonwealth Occupation Force (1946); Chief of the General Staff (1940, 1942–45); II Corps (1942); 1st Armoured Division (1941–42)
- Battles/wars: First World War; Gallipoli campaign; Second World War; North African campaign
- Awards: Knight Commander of the Order of St Michael and St George; Knight Commander of the Royal Victorian Order; Companion of the Order of the Bath; Knight of Justice of the Venerable Order of St John of Jerusalem

Lieutenant General Sir John Northcott KCMG, KCVO, CB, KStJ (24 March 1890 – 4 August 1966) was an Australian Army general who served as Chief of the General Staff during the Second World War, and commanded the British Commonwealth Occupation Force in the Occupation of Japan. He was the first Australian-born Governor of New South Wales.

Northcott joined the Australian Army as a reservist in 1908, before becoming a regular officer in 1912. On duty in Tasmania when the Great War broke out in 1914, he joined the 12th Infantry Battalion, a unit from that state. He was wounded in the landing at Gallipoli on Anzac Day and invalided to Egypt, Britain and ultimately Australia, taking no further part in the fighting. After the war, Northcott served on staff posts. He attended the Staff College, Camberley and Imperial Defence College and also spent time overseas as an exchange officer with the British Army and as a military attaché in the United States and Canada.

During World War II, Northcott was attached to the British 7th Armoured Division in the Middle East to study armoured warfare, returning to Australia in December 1941 to organise the new 1st Armoured Division. In March 1942, he assumed command II Corps. In September 1942, he was appointed Chief of the General Staff. As General Sir Thomas Blamey's principal non-operational subordinate, he was responsible for administering and training the wartime army. After the war, he served as commander of the British Commonwealth Occupation Force in the post-war Occupation of Japan. He retired from the Army in 1946 to become the Governor of New South Wales.

== Early life ==
John Northcott was born on 24 March 1890 at Creswick, Victoria, the eldest son of a storekeeper, John Northcott, and his wife Elizabeth Jane, née Reynolds. Northcott was educated at Dean State School, Grenville College, Ballarat, and the University of Melbourne. While at school, he served in the Australian Army Cadets. He was commissioned as second lieutenant in the 9th Light Horse, a Militia unit, on 14 August 1908, and was promoted to lieutenant on 31 October 1910 and captain on 31 July 1911.

On 16 November 1912, he was granted a commission as a lieutenant in the Administrative and Instructional Staff of the regular forces, then known as the Permanent Military Forces (PMF), retaining the rank of honorary captain until he was promoted to that rank in the PMF on 1 June 1918.

== First World War ==
Northcott was assigned to staff of the 6th Military District, the military district covering the state of Tasmania, where he was serving when the First World War broke out in August 1914. His initial task was assisting with the raising of Australian Imperial Force (AIF) units in Tasmania. He joined the AIF as a lieutenant on 24 August 1914 and was appointed adjutant of the 12th Infantry Battalion, which was forming at Anglesea Barracks near Hobart. He was promoted to captain in the AIF on 18 October 1914.

Northcott embarked for Egypt from Hobart with the 12th Infantry Battalion on the transport A2, HMAT Geelong on 20 October 1914. This was one of the first battalions ashore in the landing at Anzac Cove on the first Anzac Day, 25 April 1915. Northcott's part in the battle was brief, for that day he was wounded in the chest by a Turkish bullet. He lay among a pile of dead bodies until the evening, when he was found to be alive. He was evacuated to Alexandria and later to England.

While recuperating, he was joined by his fiancée, Winifred Mary Paton, who had travelled to England to be with him. The two were married at the parish church in Oxted on 14 September 1915. He returned to Australia on 30 December 1915 and took no further part in the fighting, it being "a rigid rule that no regular officer once invalided to Australia could again go overseas". His AIF appointment was terminated on 30 September 1916 and he was posted to the 5th Military District, the military district covering the state of Western Australia.

== Between the wars ==
Northcott was granted the honorary rank of major on 1 January 1919, and the brevet rank on 1 January 1920, but this was not made substantive until 1 October 1923. He attended the Staff College, Camberley from 1924 to 1926. On returning to Australia, Northcott served as Staff Officer, and later Director, Stores and Transport, at Army Headquarters in Victoria Barracks, Melbourne. He was appointed a Member (fourth class) of the Royal Victorian Order on 8 July 1927 for coordinating the transport for the 1927 six-month Royal Tour of the Duke and Duchess of York (later George VI and Queen Elizabeth The Queen Mother) that year to open the Old Parliament House, Canberra.

Northcott served on the staff of the 4th Division from 17 September 1931 to 31 January 1932 and then with the 3rd Division from 1 February to 22 November 1932. He returned to England as an exchange officer with the British Army, where he served the staff of the 44th (Home Counties) Infantry Division. He attended the Imperial Defence College in 1935. He was one of only six Australian Army officers to attend this prestigious course between 1928 and 1939, the others being Frank Berryman, John Lavarack, Henry Wynter, Vernon Sturdee, Sydney Rowell and William Bridgeford. Frederick Shedden, later Secretary of the Department of Defence, also attended this course. Northcott was given the brevet rank of lieutenant colonel on 1 July 1935, which was made substantive on 1 January 1936. He attended the Senior Officers' School at Sheerness in 1936, and was seconded to the Committee of Imperial Defence. He then served as an Australian defence attaché in the United States and Canada from September 1936 to June 1937. He was promoted to the brevet rank of colonel on 1 July 1937 and substantive rank on 13 October 1939. He served on the staff of the 4th Division until 1 September 1939, when he became Director of Military Operations and Intelligence.

== Second World War ==
Northcott was promoted to the local rank of major general on 13 October 1939, when he was appointed Deputy Chief of the General Staff. He accompanied Richard Casey to the Dominions' Conference in London in later that year as his military adviser. For his service as Deputy Chief of the General Staff, he was made a Companion of the Order of the Bath on 1 January 1941.

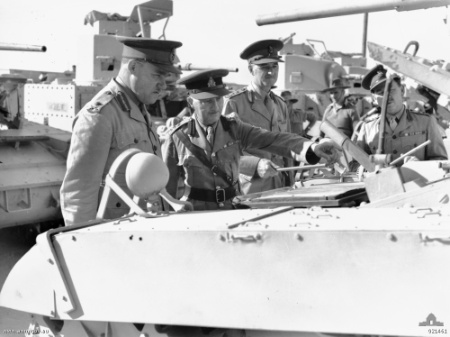
Northcott with officers of the Australian Army Ordnance Corps inspecting an American M3 Stuart Light Tank.

On 26 January 1940, Northcott became acting Chief of the General Staff (CGS) following the death of Lieutenant General Ernest Ker Squires. In August, his successor, General Sir Brudenell White, died in an air crash and Lieutenant General Vernon Sturdee succeeded him. The post of commander of the 8th Division thereby became available but Northcott was excluded from consideration because his knowledge was vital to the new CGS. When the commander of the 9th Division, Major General Henry Wynter, fell ill in January 1941, Lieutenant General Sir Thomas Blamey asked for Northcott to replace him but Northcott was involved in organising the 1st Armoured Division and the appointment instead went to Brigadier Leslie Morshead.

Northcott joined the Second Australian Imperial Force (AIF) as a major general on 1 September 1941 and was given the AIF serial number VX63396. He was attached to the 7th Armoured Division in the Middle East to study armoured warfare, returning to Australia in December 1941 to organise the new 1st Armoured Division. The job was a challenging one that some of his subordinates felt that Northcott was not up to, given his lack of command experience. In March 1942, Northcott found out from The Herald newspaper that he was to be promoted to command II Corps. "This is what they do to me", was his comment, "just as my first tank is coming down the road". The new post came with a promotion to the temporary rank of lieutenant general on 6 April 1942, which became substantive on 12 December 1945. Northcott was succeeded as commander by Major General Horace Robertson, an officer with a distinguished combat record in Operation Compass.

On 10 September 1942, Northcott was appointed Chief of the General Staff. Formerly, the Army had been controlled by the Military Board. This ceased to function on 30 July 1942, with its responsibilities being assumed by the Commander-in-Chief, General Blamey. The Adjutant General, Major General Victor Stantke, the Quartermaster General, Major General James Cannan and the Master-General of the Ordnance, Major General Leslie, who would formerly have been members of the board, now came under the Lieutenant General Administration (LGA), Lieutenant General Henry Wynter. This left the CGS with responsibility for the day-to-day running of the Army. His job also involved liaison with Royal Australian Navy (RAN) and the Royal Australian Air Force (RAAF), and he frequently had to represent Blamey in meetings with the Minister for the Army, Frank Forde.

Northcott spent much of his time from 1943 on in a long battle with the government over the number of men and women allocated to the Army. He attempted to do so without Blamey being dragged into a political fight but this proved to be impossible. In September 1944, the government reduced the Army's monthly intake of women from 925 to 500, while it only received 420 out of 4,020 men allocated to the three services. Such a meagre allocation was below what the Army needed to maintain its strength and formations had to be disbanded. Blamey took up the matter with Prime Minister John Curtin, and managed to get a more satisfactory monthly allocation of 1,500 men per month out of 3,000 allocated to the three services.

The relationship between Northcott as Chief of the General Staff and Blamey as Commander-in-Chief bore some similarities to the one between the RAAF's Chief of the Air Staff, Air Vice Marshal George Jones and Air Vice Marshal William Bostock, the commander of the RAAF forces in the field but Blamey was senior to Northcott in rank and in the Army's command structure. The relationship could still have been a delicate one, but in the event it was characterised by none of the rancour and rivalry that marred the wartime administration of the RAAF. In late 1943, Blamey sought to appoint Northcott as his deputy, but the government turned down his request, on the advice of General Douglas MacArthur, who did not want another officer who was answerable both to himself and the Australian Government. When Blamey travelled to Washington, D.C. and London in April 1944, he arranged for Northcott to act as Commander-in-Chief in his absence. After Wynter's death in February 1945, the post of LGA was abolished and the CGS again became responsible for administration.

== British Commonwealth Occupation Force ==
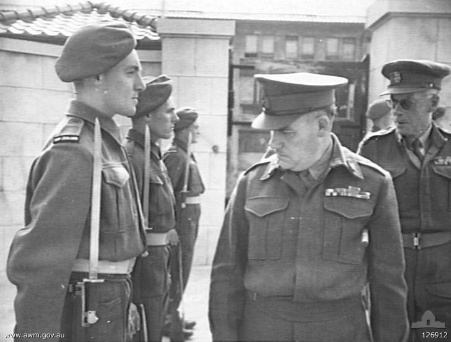
Northcott, as Commander In Chief, British Commonwealth Occupation Force (BCOF), inspects the guard of honour at HQ 9th New Zealand Infantry Brigade in Japan.

At the end of World War II, Sturdee was again invited to become CGS. He made it a condition of his acceptance that Northcott be given the appointment of Commander-in-Chief of the British Commonwealth Occupation Force (BCOF) in Japan. Sturdee felt that Northcott had missed out on opportunities for active service through his being CGS and saw the BCOF post as a just reward for that service.

Northcott led the BCOF from December 1945 until June 1946. He struck the Northcott–MacArthur agreement with General of the Army Douglas MacArthur, which governed the terms and conditions under which the BCOF would occupy part of Japan. The BCOF would serve under American command, with American policy being followed. Northcott was offered, and accepted, the post of Governor of New South Wales in April 1946. He remained in Japan until June though, because Prime Minister Ben Chifley wanted the changeover to coincide with his own visit to Japan in May, and because he needed to obtain consent of the other governments concerned for the appointment of Lieutenant General Horace Robertson as Northcott's successor. Northcott's lack of experience in command once again showed, and his command was again overhauled by Robertson.

== Governor of New South Wales ==
His appointment, on 1 August 1946 to the £5,000 post of Governor, came as a surprise, but was welcomed by the RSL and ALP. As the first Australian-born, and one of the longest-serving, Governors of New South Wales, he gave patronage and support to many charitable organisations and to youth, church and citizens' groups. Blamey was unable to secure a knighthood for Northcott for his military service, it then being Australian Labor Party policy not to award knighthoods. He was made a Knight of the Venerable Order of St John of Jerusalem in December 1946.

In 1949 the Liberals came to power and Northcott was knighted for his services as governor in 1950 and further honoured in 1954 for his work with the Royal Tour of Queen Elizabeth II. He was a freemason who, during his term as governor, was Viceregal Grand Master of the Grand Lodge of New South Wales.

In April 1949 Northcott took part in an event of historic importance at Sydney's famous Australia Hotel, being the venue of the first successful television demonstration in Australia. Northcott was televised in the hotel's ballroom as he opened the demonstration.

Northcott was Administrator of the Commonwealth in the absence of the governor-general from 19 July to 14 December 1951, and again from 30 July to 22 October 1956. While occupying that office, he held the honorary rank of general. He was awarded honorary degrees of Doctor of Letters by the University of Sydney in 1952 and the University of New England in 1956, and Doctor of Science by the New South Wales University of Technology in 1956. He retired in July 1957. In April 1964, Northcott and Forde represented Australia at General MacArthur's funeral in Washington, D.C.

== Death and legacy ==
Sir John's wife, Winifred Mary predeceased him on 7 June 1960. Survived by his two daughters, Sir John died on 4 August 1966 in his home at Wahroonga, New South Wales. He was accorded a state funeral with military honours and was cremated with his ashes interred with his wife at Northern Suburbs Memorial Gardens. Like most governors of New South Wales, his papers are in the State Library of New South Wales.

In 1968 the Northcott Municipal Council, comprising large areas formerly in the City of Sydney, and the Electoral district of Northcott in the New South Wales Legislative Assembly were dedicated in his name (the council was renamed in December 1968, while the electoral district existed until abolition in 1999). In his military career, Northcott was both highly regarded and successful staff officer, as commander of the 1st Armoured Division, II Corps and BCOF he was "noted neither for innovation nor conspicuous success", especially when compared with Robertson who "possessed the ebullience and flair that Northcott lacked". While governor, Northcott was patron of the New South Wales Society for Crippled Children. He continued to take an active in its affairs for the rest of his life. In 1995, this charity changed its name to The Northcott Society in his honour. In 2004, it became Northcott Disability Services, providing case to people of all ages with disabilities. He is also remembered through Cranbrook School, Sydney by having one of the houses named after him, Northcott House.

He was a long-standing Freemason, and served as Grand Master of the United Grand Lodge of New South Wales and the Australian Capital Territory.

== Honours ==
Viceregal styles of Sir John Northcott
- Reference style: His Excellency
- Spoken style: Your Excellency

Knight Commander of the Order of St Michael and St George (KCMG)	1950
Knight Commander of the Royal Victorian Order (KCVO)	1954
Member (Fourth Class) of the Royal Victorian Order (MVO)	1927
Companion of the Order of the Bath (CB)	1941
Knight of Justice of the Venerable Order of St John of Jerusalem (KStJ)	1946
1914–15 Star	
British War Medal	
Victory Medal	
1939–1945 Star	
Africa Star	
Pacific Star	
War Medal 1939–1945	
Australia Service Medal 1939–45	
King George VI Coronation Medal	1937
Queen Elizabeth II Coronation Medal	1953

=== Honorary military appointments ===
- 20 December 1951 – 14 August 1958: Honorary Air Commodore of No. 22 Squadron, Royal Australian Air Force.
- 1949 – 31 January 1958: Honorary Colonel of the 1st/15th Royal New South Wales Lancers.

== Bibliography ==
- Coates, Henry John (2000). "Northcott, Sir John (1890–1966)". Australian Dictionary of Biography. National Centre of Biography, Australian National University. pp. 493–494. ISBN 0-522-84236-4. ISSN 1833-7538. OCLC 222721504.
- Dennis, Peter; Grey, Jeffrey; Morris, Ewan; Prior, Robin; Conner, John (1995), The Oxford Companion to Australian Military History, South Melbourne, Victoria: Oxford University Press, ISBN 0-19-553227-9, OCLC 34325813
- Grey, Jeffrey (1992), Australian Brass: The Career of Lieutenant General Sir Horace Robertson, Oakleigh, Victoria: Cambridge University Press, ISBN 0-521-40157-7, OCLC 24502133
- Grey, Jeffrey (2001), "The Australian Army", The Australian Centenary History of Defence, Melbourne: Oxford University Press, ISBN 0-19-554114-6, OCLC 71162370
- Hasluck, Paul (1970), The Government and the People 1942–1945, Australia in the War of 1939-1945, Canberra: Australian War Memorial, OCLC 33346943
- Hopkins, R. N. L. (1978), Australian Armour : a History of the Royal Australian Armoured Corps, 1927–1972, Royal Australian Armoured Corps Tank Museum, Puckapunyal, ISBN 0-642-99407-2, OCLC 5402990
- Horner, David (1982), High Command: Australia and Allied strategy 1939–1945, Sydney: Allen & Unwin with the assistance of the Australian War Memorial, ISBN 0-86861-076-3, OCLC 9464416
- —— (1998), Blamey: The Commander-in-Chief, St Leonards, New South Wales: Allen & Unwin, ISBN 1-86448-734-8, OCLC 39291537
- Long, Gavin (1952), "To Benghazi", Australia in the War of 1939–1945 Series 1 – Army, Canberra: Australian War Memorial, OCLC 3134176
- Long, Gavin (1963), The Final Campaigns, Australia in the War of 1939–1945, Canberra: Australian War Memorial, OCLC 1297619
- Rowell, Sydney Fairbairn (1974), Full Circle, Clayton, Victoria: Melbourne University Press, ISBN 0-522-84058-2, OCLC 1427892
- The Army List of Officers of the Australian Military Forces. Melbourne: Australian Military Forces. 1945. OCLC 220688670.

Military offices
Preceded by Lieutenant General Ernest Squires	Chief of the General Staff; 1940	Succeeded by General Sir Brudenell White
New title	GOC II Corps; 1942	Succeeded by Lieutenant General Edmund Herring
Preceded by Lieutenant General Vernon Sturdee	Chief of the General Staff; 1942–1945	Succeeded by Lieutenant General Vernon Sturdee
New title	C-in-C, British Commonwealth Occupation Force; 1946	Succeeded by Lieutenant General Horace Robertson
Government offices
Preceded by The Lord Wakehurst	Governor of New South Wales; 1946–1957	Succeeded by Sir Eric Woodward
