= First Australian Army =

Australian field army

First Army
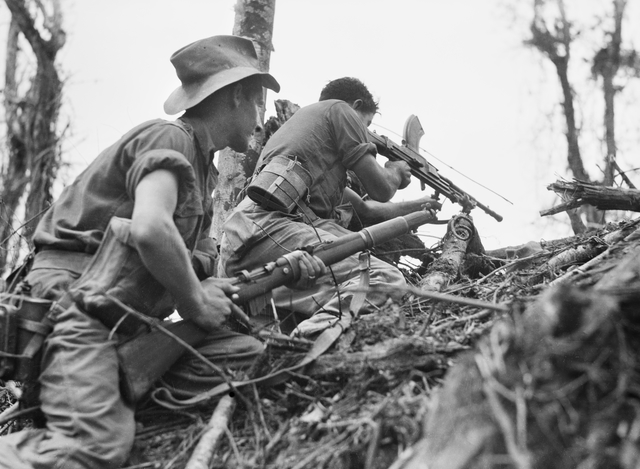
- An Australian light machine gun team in action near Wewak in June 1945
- Active: 15 April 1942 – February 1946
- Country: Australia
- Branch: Australian Army
- Type: Field Army
- Size: 90,784 troops (1943)
- Garrison/HQ: Toowoomba (1942-1944); Mareeba (1944-1946)
- Engagements: World War II

Commanders
- Notable commanders: John Lavarack; Vernon Sturdee; Horace Robertson

Insignia
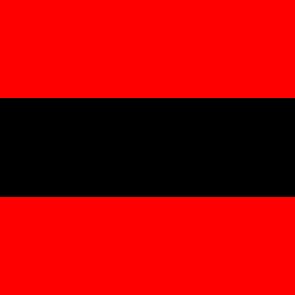
- Unit colour patch

The First Australian Army was a field army of the Australian Army, during World War II. The formation's headquarters was raised in April 1942 from the existing 1st Australian Corps headquarters, assuming command of all Allied troops in Queensland. Initially, the formation was assigned a defensive role in anticipation of a possible Japanese invasion; however, this threat subsided and eventually the army was deployed to Lae, in New Guinea, in late 1944, where it co-ordinated Australian offensives around Aitape, in New Guinea, on New Britain and Bougainville, and around Madang. The formation was disbanded in February 1946, when it was redesignated as the 8th Military District.

== History ==
The First Australian Army's headquarters was formed at Toowoomba, Queensland, on 15 April 1942 when its headquarters was raised from the former Headquarters (HQ) 1st Australian Corps, which had been formed in January 1940 in Melbourne, before deploying to the Middle East with the Second Australian Imperial Force. Under the command of Lieutenant General John Lavarack, the formation subsumed the previous Northern and Eastern Commands, and was based in Queensland and New South Wales. Split into two corps – 1st and 2nd – initially the First Army had seven Australian divisions: 1st Infantry, 2nd Infantry, 3rd Infantry, 5th Infantry, 7th Infantry, 10th Infantry and 1st Motor.

HQ First Australian Army controlled the 5th Infantry Division in Townsville, Queensland, the new 1st Australian Corps (ex HQ Southern Command) defending South Queensland, and 2nd Australian Corps (ex HQ Eastern Command) defending New South Wales. When the 1st Australian Corps was sent to New Guinea in August 1942 and became known as New Guinea Force, the 2nd Australian Corps moved to Esk, Queensland, and New South Wales came under the Second Australian Army. Two US infantry divisions – the 32nd and 41st – were also assigned to the First Australian Army for periods during this time, having been moved north and transferred from the Second Australian Army earlier in the year; nevertheless, these divisions were transferred to the US I Corps from September 1942, and were increasingly divorced from the First Australian Army's control, with this separation being formalised in February 1943 when the US Sixth Army headquarters was established in Brisbane.

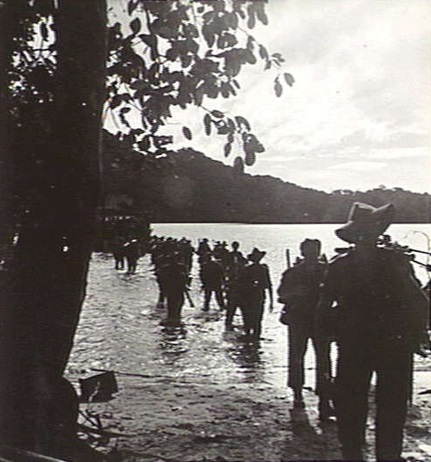
Australian troops land at Open Bay, New Britain, May 1945

During 1942 and 1943, the units under the formation's command varied, and by August 1943, they controlled the 11th Brigade at Merauke (Dutch New Guinea), Torres Strait Force at Thursday Island, the 4th Infantry Division at Townsville, the 3rd Armoured Division at Murgon, and the 2nd Australian Corps on the Atherton Tablelands, around Barrine, in Queensland. In late 1943, the First Australian Army consisted of 90,784 troops, with a further 41,871 personnel assigned to the Queensland line of communication area within the army's assigned boundary. These troops came under the First Army for operational purposes, but were administered separately by Land Headquarters.

Upon formation, the First Australian Army's role had been focused on defending against a possible Japanese invasion, and assumed the main operational responsibility for this over the Second Army, which over time became focused mainly on training and lesser command roles. But as this threat subsided, a more offensive role developed for the First Army. In May 1944, HQ First Australian Army moved to Mareeba, Queensland, to prepare for a more active role as Australian troops began relieving US troops in New Guinea to free them up for redeployment to the Philippines. While the main elements of the First Australian Army had been deployed forward to Mareeba, the formation had maintained a rear headquarters at Chermside, Queensland. This headquarters administered several minor units in Brisbane until September 1944, when they came under the control of the Second Australian Army. At this time the army's rear headquarters rejoined headquarters main at Mareeba.

In October 1944, the main element of the army's headquarters moved under Lieutenant General Vernon Sturdee, to Lae, in the Australian territory of New Guinea, where it was tasked with undertaking operations across a broad area including Bougainville, New Britain and Aitape. Here they controlled the 2nd Australian Corps on Bougainville, the 5th Infantry Division on New Britain, the 6th Infantry Division at Aitape and the 8th Infantry Brigade at Madang. On Bougainville, New Britain and around Aitape, the Australians undertook limited offensive operations. This saw them secure the northern part of Bougainville up to the Bonis Peninsula, and advance south on Bougainville towards the main Japanese strong hold around Buin, while on New Britain they were able to establish a line across the base of the Gazelle Peninsula, isolating Rabaul. In northern New Guinea, they advanced from Aitape and by the end of the war had secured Wewak.

Meanwhile, a rear headquarters was left behind at Mareeba, where it assumed control of all forces not assigned for operations in the upcoming Borneo Campaign, while the 1st Australian Corps was placed under direct command of Land Headquarters for the operation. The rear headquarters remained in existence until January 1945, when the 11th Division's headquarters assumed its duties. The HQ First Australian Army was disbanded in February 1946 when it was redesignated as the 8th Military District.

== Order of Battle ==
Upon formation in April 1942, the First Australian Army consisted of the following formations:

- Headquarters (Toowoomba)
  - 5th Infantry Division (Townsville)
  - 1st Australian Corps (Brisbane)
    - 3rd Infantry Division
    - 7th Infantry Division
  - 2nd Australian Corps (New South Wales)
    - 1st Infantry Division
    - 2nd Infantry Division
    - 10th Infantry Division
    - 1st Motor Division (original logo:)

In October 1944, the First Australian Army's deployed units consisted of the following formations:

- Headquarters (Lae)
  - 2nd Australian Corps (Bougainville)
    - 3rd Infantry Division
    - 11th Infantry Brigade
    - 23rd Infantry Brigade
  - 5th Infantry Division (New Britain)
  - 6th Infantry Division (Aitape)
  - 8th Infantry Brigade (Madang)

== Commanders ==
The First Australian Army was commanded by the following officers during the war:

- Lieutenant General John Lavarack (1942–1944)
- Lieutenant General Vernon Sturdee (1944–1945)
- Lieutenant General Horace Robertson (December 1945–1946)

== Bibliography ==
- Dexter, David (1961). The New Guinea Offensives. Australia in the War of 1939–1945. Series 1 – Army. Vol. VI. Canberra: Australian War Memorial. OCLC 2028994.
- Keogh, Eustace (1965). The South West Pacific 1941–45. Melbourne: Grayflower Productions. OCLC 7185705.
- Long, Gavin (1963). The Final Campaigns. Australia in the War of 1939–1945. Series 1 – Army. Vol. VII. Canberra: Australian War Memorial. OCLC 1297619.
- McCarthy, Dudley (1959). South-West Pacific Area – First Year. Australia in the War of 1939–1945. Series 1 – Army. Vol. V. Canberra: Australian War Memorial. OCLC 3134247.
- McKenzie-Smith, Graham (2018). The Unit Guide: The Australian Army 1939–1945, Volume 2. Warriewood, New South Wales: Big Sky Publishing. ISBN 978-1-925675-146.
- The Army List of Officers of the Australian Military Forces. Melbourne: Australian Army. 1950. OCLC 220833388.
