= Ernest Squires =

British and Australian Army general

Lieutenant-General Ernest Squires CB DSO MC
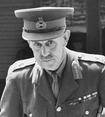
- Born: 18 December 1882; Poona, India
- Died: 2 March 1940 (aged 57); Melbourne, Australia
- Military career
- Allegiance: United Kingdom; Australia
- Branch: British Army; Australian Army
- Service years: 1903–1940
- Rank: Lieutenant-General
- Commands: Chief of the General Staff, Australia
- Conflicts: First World War; Third Anglo-Afghan War; Second World War
- Awards: Companion of the Order of the Bath; Distinguished Service Order; Military Cross; Mentioned in Despatches (5)

Lieutenant-General Ernest Ker Squires, CB, DSO, MC (18 December 1882 – 2 March 1940) was a British Army officer who served as Chief of the General Staff of the Australian Army from 1939 until his death in 1940.

== Military career ==
Squires was born in India, son of clergyman Rev. Robert Alfred Squires and Elizabeth Anne (nee Ker). Educated at Eton College and the Royal Military Academy, Woolwich, Squires was commissioned into the Royal Engineers as a second lieutenant on 17 January 1903. He served with the 3rd Sappers and Miners in India from 1905. On 3 March 1912 he married at Westgate-on-Sea, Kent, Ethel Elsie Risley.

Squires served in the First World War and was wounded at Givenchy in 1914 and at Ypres in 1915. Later that year he saw action again – this time in Mesopotamia, and in the Third Anglo-Afghan War in 1919. During these five years, he was awarded the Military Cross, the Distinguished Service Order, and mentioned in despatches six times and on 17 January 1918 was promoted to major.

In 1932 he was made brigadier on the General Staff of Southern Command.

Squires became Director of Staff Duties at the War Office in 1936. On 30 June 1938 he was promoted to lieutenant general and appointed inspector general of the Australian Military Forces.

He was made Chief of the General Staff in 1939. His health failed him and he died early the following year after cancer surgery in St Ives Private Hospital, East Melbourne. He was cremated at Springvale Crematorium, Melbourne, and is commemorated on the Commonwealth War Graves Commission's Victoria Cremation Memorial there.

Military offices
Preceded by Lieutenant General John Lavarack	Chief of the General Staff; 1939–1940	Succeeded by Lieutenant General John Northcott
