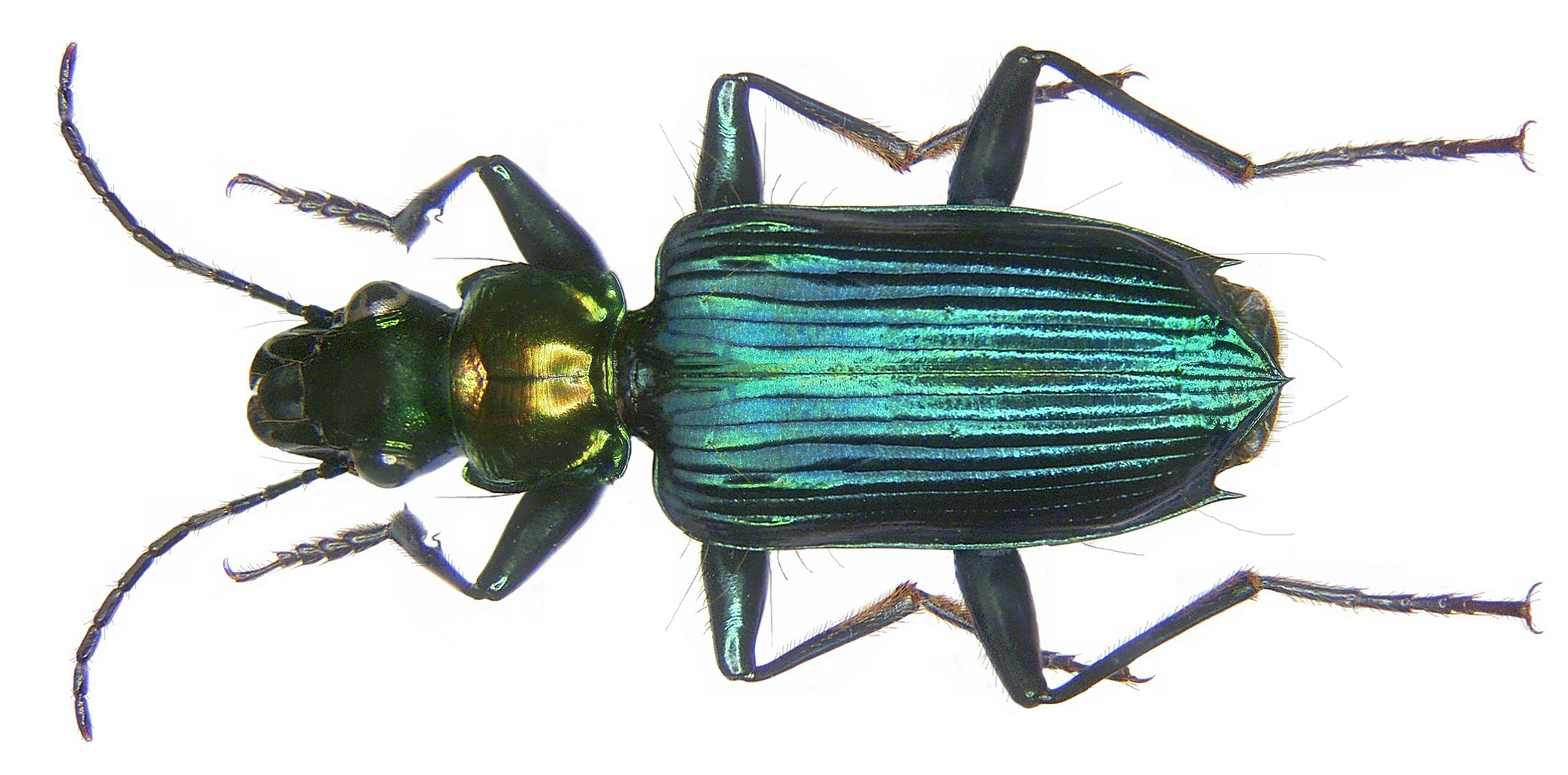

Scientific classification
- Domain: Eukaryota
- Kingdom: Animalia
- Phylum: Arthropoda
- Class: Insecta
- Order: Coleoptera
- Suborder: Adephaga
- Family: Carabidae
- Tribe: Odacanthini
- Genus: Dobodura; Darlington, 1968

= Dobodura =

Genus of beetles

Dobodura is a genus of beetles in the family Carabidae.

== Species ==
Dobodura contains the following six species:

- Dobodura alildablldooya Liebherr, 2017
- Dobodura armata Darlington, 1968
- Dobodura hexaspina Liebherr, 2017
- Dobodura obtusa Liebherr, 2017
- Dobodura svensoni Liebherr, 2017
- Dobodura toxopei Liebherr, 2017
