= 8th Military District =

Administrative district of the Australian Army

Coordinates: 4.2°S 152.183°E

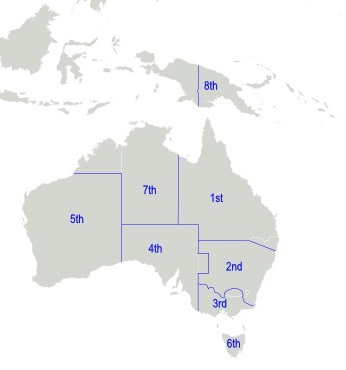
Australian military districts, October 1939

The 8th Military District was an administrative district of the Australian Army. During the Second World War, the 8th Military District covered the Territory of New Guinea, the Solomon Islands and the New Hebrides, with its headquarters firstly at Rabaul and later at Port Moresby.

In 1942, the 8th Military District was converted into New Guinea Force.
