= Robert Hobys =

Robert Hobys is the first recorded registrary of the University of Cambridge.

Hobbes was born in Peterborough, went to school at Eton and entered King's College, Cambridge in 1495. He graduated BA in 1500 and MA in 1503. During his years in Cambridge, Hobys resided in the parish of Great St Mary's and was Esquire Bedell from 1504 until his appointment as the university's senior administrative officer (Registrary). He died in 1543.

Academic offices
| Preceded by First known appointment | Cambridge University Registrary; 1506–1543 | Succeeded by John Mere |
