= Matthew Stokys =

Third recorded Registrary of the University of Cambridge (d. 1591)

Matthew Stokys was the third recorded Registrary of the University of Cambridge.

He was born in Eton and went to school there before entering King's College, Cambridge in 1531. He graduated B.A. in 1536 and M.A. in 1539. He was a Fellow of King's from 1534 to 1548. He was Esquire Bedell from 1557 to 1585 and Registrary from 1558 until his death on 16 November 1591.

Academic offices
| Preceded by John Mere | Cambridge University Registrary; 1558–1591 | Succeeded by Thomas Smith |
