= Thomas Smith (Registrary) =

Thomas Smith was the fourth recorded Registrary of the University of Cambridge.

Mere was born in Northamptonshire. He entered Trinity College, Cambridge in 1576. He graduated B.A. in 1580 and M.A. in 1583. He was elected a Fellow of St John's College, Cambridge from 1534 to 1548. He was Esquire Bedell from 1585 to 1592 and Registrary from 1591 until 1600.

Academic offices
| Preceded by Matthew Stokys | Cambridge University Registrary; 1591–1600 | Succeeded by James Tabor |
