= John Mere =

John Mere is the second recorded Registrary of the University of Cambridge.

Mere was born in Mayfield, East Sussex, went to school at Eton and entered King's College, Cambridge in 1521. He graduated BA in 1526 and MA in 1529. During his years in Cambridge Hobys resided in the parish of Great St Mary's. He was Esquire Bedell from 1530 until his appointment as the university's senior administrative officer (Registrary) in 1543. He died on 13 April 1558.

Academic offices
Preceded by Robert Hobys	Cambridge University Registrary; 1543–1558	Succeeded by Matthew Stokys
