= Iven Mackay =

Australian Army officer (1882–1966)

Sir Iven Giffard Mackay
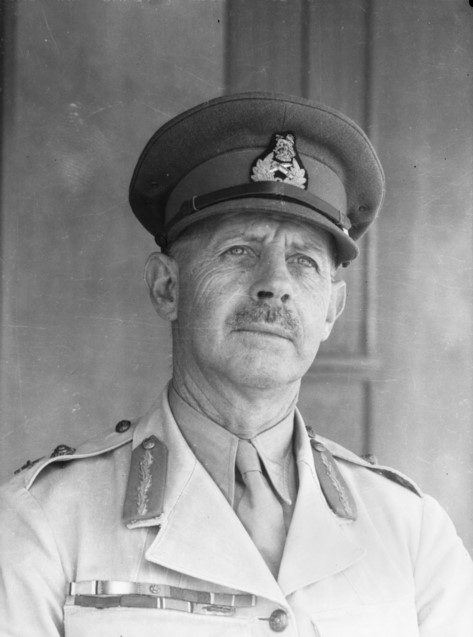
- Mackay in 1941
- Born: 7 April 1882; Grafton, New South Wales
- Died: 30 September 1966 (aged 84); Sydney, New South Wales
- Military career
- Allegiance: Australia
- Branch: Australian Army
- Service years: 1913–1946
- Rank: Lieutenant general
- Nickname: "Mister Chips"
- Service number: NX363
- Commands: New Guinea Force (1943–44); Second Army (1942–44); 6th Division (1940–41); 2nd Division (1937–40); 5th Infantry Brigade (1930–32); 8th Infantry Brigade (1921–26); 9th Infantry Brigade (1920–21); 1st Infantry Brigade (1918); 1st Machine Gun Battalion (1918); 4th Infantry Battalion (1916–18)
- Conflicts: First World War; Gallipoli Campaign; Battle of Pozières; Second Battle of Bullecourt; Battle of Passchendaele; Battle of the Lys; Battle of Amiens; Battle of the Hindenburg Line; Second World War; Operation Compass; Battle of Greece; Salamaua–Lae campaign; Huon Peninsula campaign; Finisterre Range campaign
- Awards: Knight Commander of the Order of the British Empire; Companion of the Order of St Michael and St George; Distinguished Service Order & Bar; Volunteer Decoration; Mentioned in Despatches (6); Croix de guerre (France); War Cross (Greece)
- Other work: Australian High Commissioner to India (1943–48)

Lieutenant General Sir Iven Giffard Mackay, KBE, CMG, DSO & Bar, VD (7 April 1882 – 30 September 1966) was a senior Australian Army officer who served in both world wars.

Mackay graduated from the University of Sydney in 1904 and taught physics there from 1910 until 1914, when he joined the Australian Imperial Force shortly after the outbreak of the First World War. He served with the 4th Infantry Battalion at Gallipoli, where he distinguished himself in hand-to-hand fighting at the Battle of Lone Pine. In April 1916, he assumed command of the 4th Infantry Battalion on the Western Front and led it at the Battle of Pozières, Battle of Bullecourt and Battle of Broodseinde. He was promoted to brigadier general in June 1918, and led the 1st Infantry Brigade at the Battle of Hazebrouck, the Battle of Amiens and in the attack on the Hindenburg Line.

After the war, Mackay studied physics at the University of Cambridge under Ernest Rutherford before returning to Australia and his old job as a lecturer at the University of Sydney. From 1933 to 1940 he was headmaster of Cranbrook School, Sydney. He remained in the Militia between the wars, and was a major general by the time the Second World War broke out. He was selected to command the 6th Division in 1940, and led it through the Australian Army's first battles of the war. Any doubts about his ability soon disappeared with the commitment of the division to the Western Desert Campaign. During the Battle of Bardia in January 1941, the 6th Division captured the fortified town along with 36,000 Italian prisoners. In the Battle of Greece, he became the only Australian general to face the Waffen-SS in battle. He suffered a series of reverses in Greece, but impressed the troops under his command with his courage under fire. He was recalled to Australia in 1941 to serve as General Officer Commanding Home Forces. On 6 April 1942, he assumed command of the Second Army. During 1943 he twice commanded New Guinea Force in the fighting in the New Guinea campaign. His active service ended with his appointment as High Commissioner to India in November 1943.

== Early life and career ==
Iven Giffard Mackay was born in Grafton, New South Wales, on 7 April 1882. The eldest of three children, he was the only son of the Reverend Isaac Mackay, a Presbyterian minister from Armadale, Sutherland, Scotland, and his Canadian wife Emily Frances, née King. Iven was educated at Grafton Superior Public School, Newington College, and the University of Sydney, where he opened the batting for the university's cricket team, and won Blues for rugby union football and rowing. He graduated with his Bachelor of Arts (BA) degree in 1904.

Mackay had served in the Newington College cadet unit, reaching the rank of sergeant and winning a trophy in 1899 for being the school's best rifle shot. In 1911, he became a lieutenant in the Cadet Corps. On 20 March 1913, he transferred to the Militia as a lieutenant. In July he became the adjutant of the 26th Infantry Battalion, which was commanded by Lieutenant Colonel Henry MacLaurin. As part of his training, he attended the School of Musketry in Randwick, New South Wales. He was promoted to captain on 1 June 1914. Mackay joined Sydney Church of England Grammar School in 1905, teaching various subjects and coaching the rowing and rugby teams. In 1910 he returned to the University of Sydney to teach physics. From 1913 to 1914, he studied for a Diploma of Military Science course at the University of Sydney.

== First World War ==
Mackay joined the Australian Imperial Force on 27 August 1914 as adjutant of the 4th Infantry Battalion, with the rank of captain. On 4 September 1914, he married his fiancée, Marjorie Eveline Meredith, the daughter of Lieutenant Colonel John Meredith, in a ceremony at St Philip's Church, Sydney. The couple had met while Mackay was on holiday in Paterson, New South Wales, in 1910.

In October 1914, Mackay suffered a riding accident and was taken to Royal Prince Alfred Hospital with a punctured lung and broken ribs. The injury forced him to miss the scheduled embarkation of his battalion. He sailed for Egypt with the 1st Reinforcements of the 13th Infantry Battalion, departing Sydney on the transport Berrima on 19 December 1914, arriving at Alexandria on 31 January 1915. He was then posted back to the 4th Infantry Battalion as the Transport Officer. He observed the landing at Gallipoli from the transport SS Lake Michigan, but did not go ashore with the battalion, as his job was to take care of the horses. He re-joined the battalion on shore on 8 May 1915. Heavy casualties in the early fighting had depleted the officer ranks and Mackay was promoted to major on 14 July 1915, and given command of a company in August.

=== Gallipoli ===
On 6 August 1915, Mackay was involved in the Battle of Lone Pine. When the attack began, Mackay went over the top at the head of an attack. He ignored the first Turkish trench, taking a direct line to his objective. Firing from the hip, he shot and killed several Turks in the trenches below. Mackay positioned himself at the junction of two trenches, shooting down more enemy troops. When no others appeared, he came to the belief that the trenches were in Australian hands and ran across the junction into a wide bay. The first man who attempted to follow was shot dead, as were the next two after him. The rest decided not to follow. Mackay took up a position on a fire step, a raised part of the trench floor which allows men to fire over the top. Three Turkish soldiers appeared in the trench. Mackay attempted to fire but his magazine was empty. He lunged at the Turks, grazing one and making all three run. Mackay then instructed his party to fortify the position with sandbags. As the barricade was built up, it became possible for the rest of the party to join Mackay. The post became the north eastern corner of the new Australian position at Lone Pine. It was in an exposed position and came under hand grenade attack from Turkish troops. Mackay was slightly injured in one such attack. When Lieutenant Jack Massie was sent to relieve Mackay during the night, Mackay refused to leave the post.

By the next day, Mackay realised that the position could not be held. He personally kept the enemy at bay with his rifle while new barricades were constructed. When he was satisfied with the security of the new position he reported to the battalion commander, who sent him to have his wounds dressed. Mackay's injuries were severe enough for him to be evacuated to Malta and then England, and he did not rejoin his battalion until February 1916, by which time it had been withdrawn to Egypt. For his actions at Lone Pine, Mackay was nominated for the Victoria Cross. He was overlooked for the award, although he was later mentioned in despatches.

=== Western Front ===
Mackay sailed for France on 20 March 1916 on the transport Minnewaska as part of the Advance Party of the 1st Division. On 18 April 1916, he was promoted to lieutenant colonel and assumed command of the 4th Infantry Battalion. He led it at the Battle of Pozières in July, where it was involved in the capture of the town. Here, a famous incident occurred:

Colonels Stevens and Mackay had left their headquarters and walked forward up Dead Man's Road (the sunken end of the Chalk Pit road) to its junction with the main road for the purpose of making hurried plans for the advance of their men, and instructing the company commanders. As they stood at this desolate corner (the most actively shelled in Pozières), surrounded by shredded tree-trunks and the dead, a panting messenger stumbled up to them with an envelope marked "Urgent and Secret". They hurriedly tore it open. The message read: "A number of cases have lately occurred of men failing to salute the army commander when passing in his car, in spite of the fact that the car carries his flag upon the bonnet. This practice must cease."

For his part in the battle, Mackay was mentioned in despatches a second time. He was awarded the Distinguished Service Order for his gallantry at Lone Pine, his part in the capture of Pozières, and his role in repelling a German counterattack at Mouquet Farm, near Pozières.

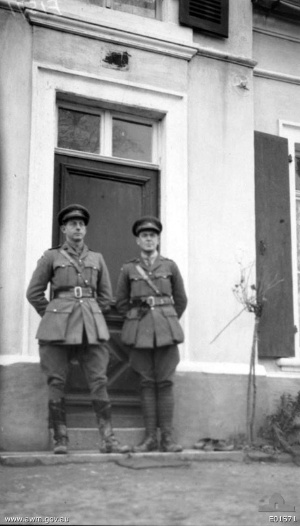
Informal portrait of Lieutenant Colonel I. G. Mackay DSO (left), Commanding Officer of the 4th Infantry Battalion, AIF, with his Adjutant, Lieutenant L. A. McKenzie, at Samer

Mackay held the temporary position of commander of the 1st Infantry Brigade in January 1917, for the first of what would be five times totalling 92 days in 1917. He commanded the 4th Infantry Battalion in the advance to the Hindenburg Line, including the capture of the fortified town of Hermies. During the German counter-attack at Lagnicourt in April 1917 his battalion held its positions, repulsing the Germans with heavy casualties.

Acting brigade commander again during the Second Battle of Bullecourt in May, Mackay was mentioned in despatches for the third time, and awarded a bar to his Distinguished Service Order. His citation read:

For conspicuous gallantry and devotion to duty. While acting as brigadier, when the brigade on the right was broken into by the enemy, the battalion under his orders counter-attacked and assisted to drive out the enemy and restore the position. His action in repelling the counter-attack was of the utmost value, and his prompt action and extreme resolution showed leadership of a high order.

Along with Brigadier General H. Gordon Bennett and others, Mackay received personal congratulations from Field Marshal Sir Douglas Haig. He later received his medals from King George V in a ceremony at Buckingham Palace. Mackay led his battalion once more at the Battle of Broodseinde, earning a fourth mention in despatches. In March 1918, the four machine gun companies in each division were grouped into machine gun battalions. Mackay was given command of the 1st Machine Gun Battalion, the 1st Division's new battalion, which he led in the Battle of Hazebrouck. He was given the brevet rank of major in the 26th Infantry Battalion in the AMF back home on 3 June 1918.

On 6 June 1918, Mackay was heading on leave to London to visit his wife, who had managed to reach England after a long battle with wartime travel restrictions, when he was stopped and turned back at Boulogne by British military police. He had been appointed to command the 1st Infantry Brigade and had to return at once. He was immediately promoted to colonel and temporary brigadier general. Mackay commanded the 1st Infantry Brigade in the later stages of the fighting around Hazebrouck. In the operations east of there in June and July, his brigade was exceptionally active in the form of minor operations and patrolling that became known as the peaceful penetration.

In August, the 1st Division moved south to the Somme sector to participate in the Battle of Amiens and later the attack on the Hindenburg Line. Through his "careful preliminary preparations and sound tactical knowledge", Mackay contributed to the successes of his brigade and was once more mentioned in despatches. For his service as a brigade commander, he was appointed a Companion of the Order of St Michael and St George (CMG) in the 1919 New Year Honours. He was also awarded the French Croix de guerre for his service on the Western Front.

== Between the wars ==
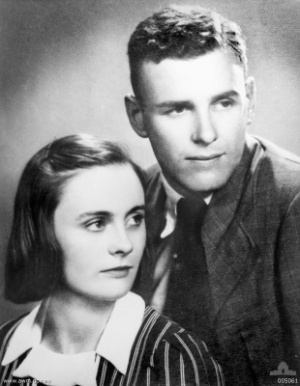
Lieutenant W. H. Travers and Mrs. Jean Margaret Travers, son-in-law and daughter of Major General Iven Mackay, January 1941

After the end of the war Mackay took advantage of Brigadier General George Long's education scheme to study physics at Emmanuel College at the University of Cambridge under Ernest Rutherford. His first child, Jean Margaret, was born in Cambridge in 1919. Iven and Marjorie later had two more children – a son, Iven John, born in Sydney in 1920, and another daughter, Alison, born in Sydney in 1930.

They returned to Australia aboard the transport Mantua, which reached Sydney on 19 February 1920. With the war over, the AIF was demobilised, and Mackay's appointment to the AIF was terminated on 4 April 1920. Mackay returned to lecturing in physics at the University of Sydney. Between 1922 and 1932 he was student adviser. From 1925 he was also faculty secretary. From 1932 to 1940 Mackay also worked evenings as a Commonwealth Film Appeals Censor.

In 1933, he was appointed headmaster of Cranbrook School, Sydney. The school's constitution was changed to allow Mackay, a Presbyterian, to hold the post. As a result of a case of mistaken identity following the death of Major General Kenneth Mackay in 1935, Mackay got to read his own obituary in The Times, entitled "Athlete, Soldier and Headmaster". He normally avoided publicity, but this incident brought him to national attention.

Alison Ann Mackay in 1941

Mackay remained active in the Militia throughout the inter-war period. He held the rank of honorary brigadier general from 21 January 1920 to late June 1937, when he was promoted to that rank substantively. He commanded the 9th Infantry Brigade from 1 July 1920 to 30 April 1921; the 8th Infantry Brigade from 1 May 1921 to 30 April 1926; and the 5th Infantry Brigade from 1 May 1930 to 31 December 1932. On 24 March 1937 he took command of the 2nd Division. He was promoted to major general on 1 July 1937. Mackay was one of only four Militia officers to be substantively promoted to that rank between 1929 and 1939.

His term of office at Cranbrook ended acrimoniously after Justice Kenneth Street and others blamed Mackay for the school's slow recovery from the Great Depression, and the school council voted to remove him on 25 October 1939. Mackay was given twelve months' notice. When, in December 1939, Mackay's daughter Jean married Lieutenant W. H. Travers, the grandson of Major General William Holmes; the reception was held at Cranbrook.

== Second World War ==
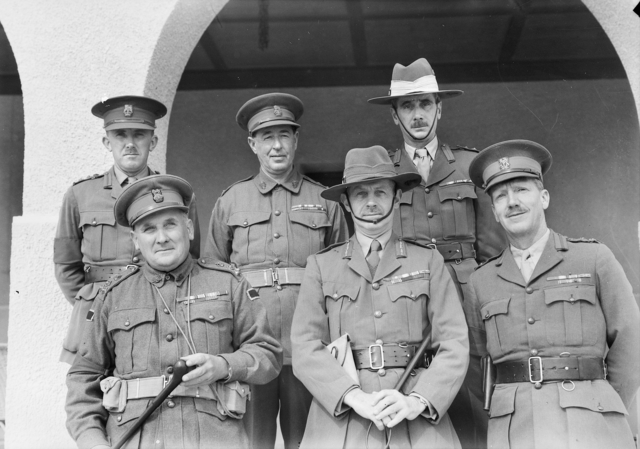
Senior officers of the 6th Division, December 1940. Front row, left to right: Brigadier Arthur Allen, Major General Iven Mackay, Brigadier Horace Robertson. Back row, left to right: Colonel Frank Berryman, Brigadier Stanley Savige, Colonel Alan Vasey

At the outbreak of war in 1939, Mackay was ranked seventh on the army's seniority list. Following formation of a second infantry division for the Second Australian Imperial Force in 1940, Lieutenant General Sir Thomas Blamey was elevated to command of the newly created I Corps. Mackay was selected to command the 7th Division on the advice of General Sir Brudenell White but Cabinet, after consulting with Blamey, switched this appointment to the 6th Division. Mackay assumed command on 4 April 1940, receiving the serial number NX363, and sailed from Melbourne for the Middle East on the ocean liner RMS Strathaird on 15 April.

The troops nicknamed him "Mr Chips", after the title character of the best-selling 1934 novel Goodbye, Mr. Chips and the subsequent 1939 film, a reference to his peacetime profession, but also to the impression he gave of being cool, reserved and strict. Some of his staff had reservations about him. Colonel Alan Vasey, his assistant adjutant and quartermaster general, asserted that Mackay lacked the ruthlessness to remove Militia officers who were not performing well. Vasey fumed about "that bloody schoolteacher who wants to dot every 'i' and cross every 't'". Many regular officers were embittered by years of slow promotion followed by Prime Minister Robert Menzies ordering that commands in the 6th Division be given to Militia officers. Colonel Frank Berryman considered this "a damn insult to the professional soldier, calculated to split the Army down the centre. We were to be the hewers of wood and the drawers of water. We, the only people who really knew the job, were to assist these Militia fellows". Berryman, who worked closely with Mackay as his chief of staff, held him in high regard. "For moral and physical courage", said Berryman, "few equalled him—none ever surpassed him. He was an educated and most knowledgeable soldier ... and extremely patient". His Commander, Royal Australian Artillery, a reservist, Brigadier Edmund Herring, considered Mackay "a most competent and able commander in North Africa and Greece, but a bit old ... Modest, dignified, shy and scholarly ... In action he never knew the meaning of fear ..."

=== Libya ===
His appointment to command the 6th Division meant that Mackay led its—and the Australian Army's—first battles of the war. Doubts about Mackay's ability soon disappeared with the commitment of the division to Operation Compass. During the Battle of Bardia, in Libya in January 1941, the 6th Division captured the fortified town along with 36,000 Italian prisoners. For this success, Mackay was made a Knight Commander of the Order of the British Empire (KBE). In a war of rapid movement over long distances, Mackay demonstrated careful planning and recognised the need to reinforce success. He also impressed others with the way he cared for soldiers' lives. "Not only do I want Tobruk quickly", he told his brigadiers before the battle, "but I also want it cheaply". The victory at Bardia was followed by successes at Tobruk, Derna and Benghazi.

=== Greece ===
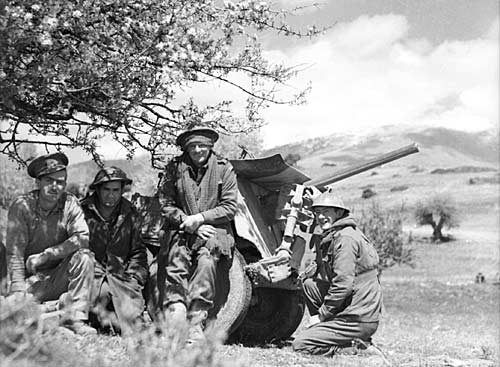
Australian anti-tank gunners resting, soon after their withdrawal from the Vevi area

The 6th Division's next campaign was the failed Battle of Greece, a disaster for the British Commonwealth forces sent there. While in Greece, Mackay led a hastily assembled Australian-British-New Zealand-Greek formation known as Mackay Force, defending the Klidi Pass at the Battle of Vevi. The Allies were forced to retreat in a fierce assault by the Leibstandarte SS Adolf Hitler brigade. Mackay was the only Australian general to face the Waffen-SS in battle.

As in Libya, Mackay shared the hardships of living in the field with his men, and impressed them by his coolness during air raids. They watched him sit in the open during attacks; on one such occasion on 19 April 1941, Mackay waited out a two-and-a-half-hour raid when his car was hit and his driver wounded. One staff officer "noticed Mackay moving in front of his tent quite unconcerned about the movement of enemy planes. He neither looked at the planes nor at the men dashing about, but they saw him, and those moving towards shelter stopped, and many of those who had gained shelter returned to their duties. Personal example is the only paying proposition in such circumstances". For his actions in Greece, he was mentioned in despatches a sixth time, and awarded the Greek War Cross (First Class).

Casualties in Greece included Mackay's son-in-law, Captain W. H. Travers, who was captured in the Battle of Crete. Mackay resolved to reform the battalions that had been destroyed in Greece, and to rebuild his shattered division from the remnants that had been evacuated to Alexandria. He developed a training program in Syria in which he attempted to apply the lessons of the campaign in Greece.

=== Defence of Australia ===
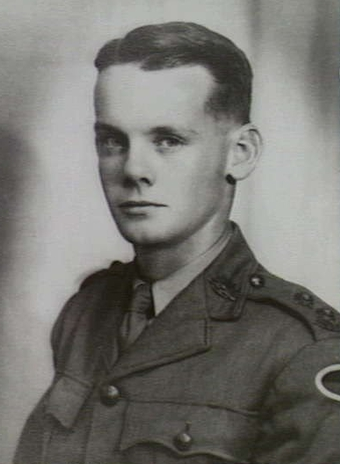
Lieutenant Iven John Mackay, January 1941

One lesson of Greece was that modern war was a young man's trade. Brigadier Sydney Rowell recommended to Blamey that all generals over the age of 50 be retired. In July 1941, Ernest Turnbull, representing the motion picture industry, approached Menzies and several members of his Cabinet about the possibility of Mackay becoming Chief Commonwealth Film Censor. Menzies had a different post in mind. On 24 July 1941 the War Cabinet decided to appoint a General Officer Commanding Home Forces. In a cable to Blamey, Menzies stipulated that the War Cabinet wanted a high-ranking officer like Mackay with active service in the current war. Blamey replied that he considered "Mackay most suitable for the appointment".

On 14 August 1941, Mackay handed over command of the 6th Division to Herring. Mackay departed Cairo for Australia by flying boat on 22 August. En route, he stopped in Singapore to confer with Bennett, now the commander of the 8th Division, which was based there, and had dinner at the Raffles Hotel with his son, Lieutenant Iven Mackay, an officer with the 8th Division's 2/18th Infantry Battalion.

Mackay assumed command of Home Forces on 1 September 1941, with the rank of lieutenant general. His task was to prepare the Militia to repel a Japanese invasion. Official historian Dudley McCarthy noted that:

If Mackay had been in any way deceived by the grandiloquence of his new title his illusions were soon dissipated when he assumed command on 1 September. Initially there was reluctance to grant him the substantive promotion he had been promised. He found that his authority did not extend over the forward areas of New Guinea and the Northern Territory; nor was he to be responsible for "the defence of Australia" as such, as this responsibility remained with General Sturdee, the Chief of the General Staff. In short his command was far more circumscribed than he might have expected, with the added disadvantage of calling for a political finesse to the possession of which he laid few claims. He was a gallant and successful soldier, with a long record of distinguished service to his country, and a man of instinctive and unassuming courtesy. But neither his qualities of character and temperament nor the academic seclusion of his life between the wars fitted him well for the role of a senior military adviser to a Cabinet inexperienced in military affairs.

With the Fall of Singapore in February 1942, Mackay's son Iven became a prisoner of war of the Japanese. A Japanese invasion of Australia now became a real possibility, so Mackay submitted a contingency plan in which he outlined a defence strategy whereby the army would concentrate on the defence of the most vital areas of eastern and southern Australia. This later gave rise to the controversial but mythical "Brisbane Line".

Regular officers took the opportunity to give Mackay petty snubs. Army Headquarters continually addressed him as "major general", although his promotion to lieutenant general had been gazetted, and his pay was only £1,564 compared with Sturdee's £2,269. His AIF serial number was taken away from him and he was sent a new recruit's papers to fill in. The Military Board even attempted to bring him before a medical board to decide his fitness for further service. Only the intervention of the Minister for the Army, Frank Forde, averted this. During a sweeping reorganisation of the army by Blamey, Mackay became commander of the Second Army on 6 April 1942.

=== New Guinea ===
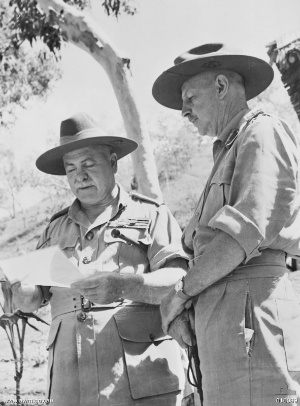
Lieutenant General Sir Iven Mackay (right) meets with General Sir Thomas Blamey (left)

When Blamey relieved Rowell of command of I Corps in New Guinea, he nominated Herring as successor. Blamey proposed Mackay as a second choice but preferred Herring as he was much younger, and this was important in the taxing New Guinea climate. When Blamey relinquished command of New Guinea Force on 30 January 1943, he handed over temporary command to Mackay to enable Herring to go on leave. The period was a quiet one, with no major operations being carried out, and Mackay handed back to Herring and returned to command of the Second Army at Parramatta, New South Wales, in May 1943.

On 28 August 1943, Mackay once again assumed command of New Guinea Force. This time, important operations were being undertaken in the Battle of Finschhafen and Mackay's period of command was marred by disagreements with General Douglas MacArthur's staff over the reinforcement of Finschhafen. Junior commanders felt that Mackay should have been more forceful, and should have enlisted the help of his superior, Blamey, at an earlier stage. Blamey agreed with them, feeling that his old colleague was slowing down, and no longer possessed the vigour required for the campaign in New Guinea. Mackay left New Guinea in November 1943, handing over command of New Guinea Force to Lieutenant General Sir Leslie Morshead, and on 20 January 1944 Mackay relinquished command of Second Army and New Guinea Force.

=== India ===
In November 1943, it was announced that Prime Minister John Curtin, with Blamey's approval, had appointed Mackay as High Commissioner to India. Sir Iven and Lady Mackay sailed from Perth, on SS Tanda on 14 February 1944. Their arrival in Delhi marked the beginning of an Australian diplomatic presence in India. When Lieutenant Iven Mackay was liberated, the Supreme Allied Commander of South East Asia Command, Admiral Lord Louis Mountbatten had him brought to Delhi to be reunited with his family. With the war's end, Mackay retired from the army on 27 February 1946, and the post of High Commissioner gradually became a civilian one. India was not yet independent, but was about to become so, and Mackay met with future leaders Jawaharlal Nehru, Indira Gandhi and Muhammad Ali Jinnah. Mackay and the Minister for External Affairs, Dr H. V. Evatt, supported Indian independence, while expressing the hope that India would remain in the British Commonwealth. Mackay also promoted trade between India and Australia, and fostered a plan for Indian students and technicians to study and train in Australia. His term as high commissioner ended in May 1948.

== Post war ==
Mackay was approached to consider nomination as a Liberal Party of Australia candidate for the Australian Senate, but declined. Instead, he accepted a directorship of Australian Cotton Textile Industries. From 1950 to 1952, he chaired the New South Wales recruiting committee which was set up by the Federal government to increase enlistment in the armed forces. The University of Sydney appointed Mackay an honorary Esquire Bedell in 1950 and awarded him an honorary degree of Doctor of Laws in 1952. When Blamey died in 1951, Mackay rushed to Melbourne to be one of his pallbearers. Mackay visited Greece in 1952 for the unveiling of a memorial to British Commonwealth servicemen who died in the 1941 campaign. In 1961, he returned for the dedication of the Commonwealth War Cemetery at Faliro. This time he also revisited the Gallipoli battlefields, sailing to the Dardanelles on HMY Britannia as a guest of Field Marshal Prince Henry, Duke of Gloucester. Mackay climbed from the beach at ANZAC Cove up to Lone Pine once more. When it became known that he was visiting the United States in 1961, the US Army took him to see Fort Sill.

Mackay died at his home in East Lindfield, New South Wales, on 30 September 1966 and was cremated after a service at St Stephen's, Sydney. He was survived by his wife, his son and his two daughters. Veterans lined the streets and he had ten generals for his pallbearers: Herring, Woodward, Stevens, Pulver, Stevenson, Macarthur-Onslow, Dougherty, Harrison, Cullen and Galleghan. Mackay's papers and portraits are held in the Australian War Memorial in Canberra.

== Notes ==
Military offices
New command	GOC Second Army; 1942–1944	Succeeded by Lieutenant General Sir Leslie Morshead
Preceded by Lieutenant General Sir Thomas Blamey	GOC 6th Division; 1940–1941	Succeeded by Major General Edmund Herring
Diplomatic posts
New title Position established	Australian High Commissioner to India; 1943–1948	Succeeded by Charles Kevin as Acting High Commissioner
