= Bedel =

Administrative official at universities in several European countries

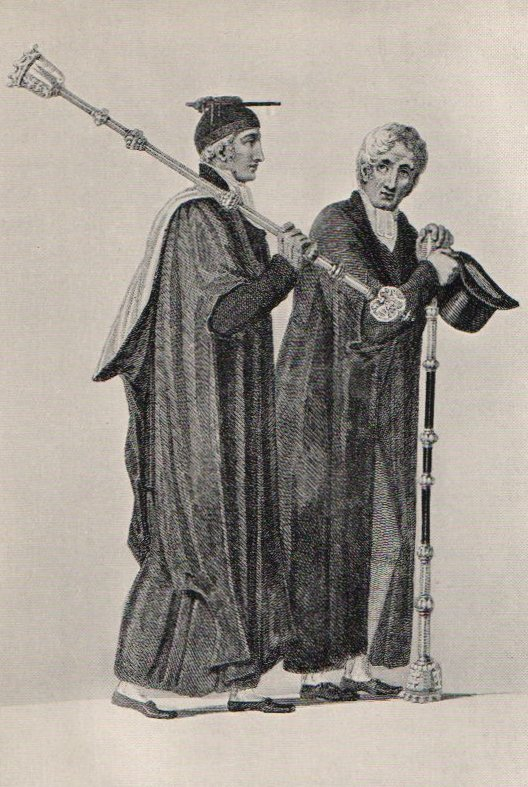
1815 engraving (from Rudolf Ackermann's History of the University of Cambridge) of an Esquire Bedell (left) and a Yeoman Bedell (right)

The bedel (from medieval Latin pedellus or bidellus, occasionally bidellus generalis, from Old High German bital, pital, "the one who invites, calls"; cognate with beadle) was, and is to some extent still, an administrative official at universities in several European countries, and often had a policiary function at the time when universities had their own jurisdiction over students.

== History of the bedel ==
The office can be traced back as far as 1245, and originated in Paris. In French universities, the position was frequently open to purchase. In the medieval English universities in Oxford and Cambridge, the bedel was an administrative assistant of the chancellor and the proctors. The bedel was, among other things, to collect fines and fees, keep rolls of scholars with the license to teach, and participate in ceremonial dress in academic processions and on other similar occasions. There were six bedels at Oxford, one superior and one inferior bedel for each faculty, while Cambridge had only two (Cobban, p. 231f); Oxford today has four bedels representing Divinity, Law, Medicine, and Arts, plus, since 2012, two additional bedels (Quintus Bedel and Sextus Bedel). The University of St Andrews has six bedels at official ceremonies and still maintains at least a single Bedel at the weekly United College chapel service. The office of Esquire Bedell is still preserved for purely ceremonial purposes at some other universities, including the University of Southampton in the UK.

== Pedell ==
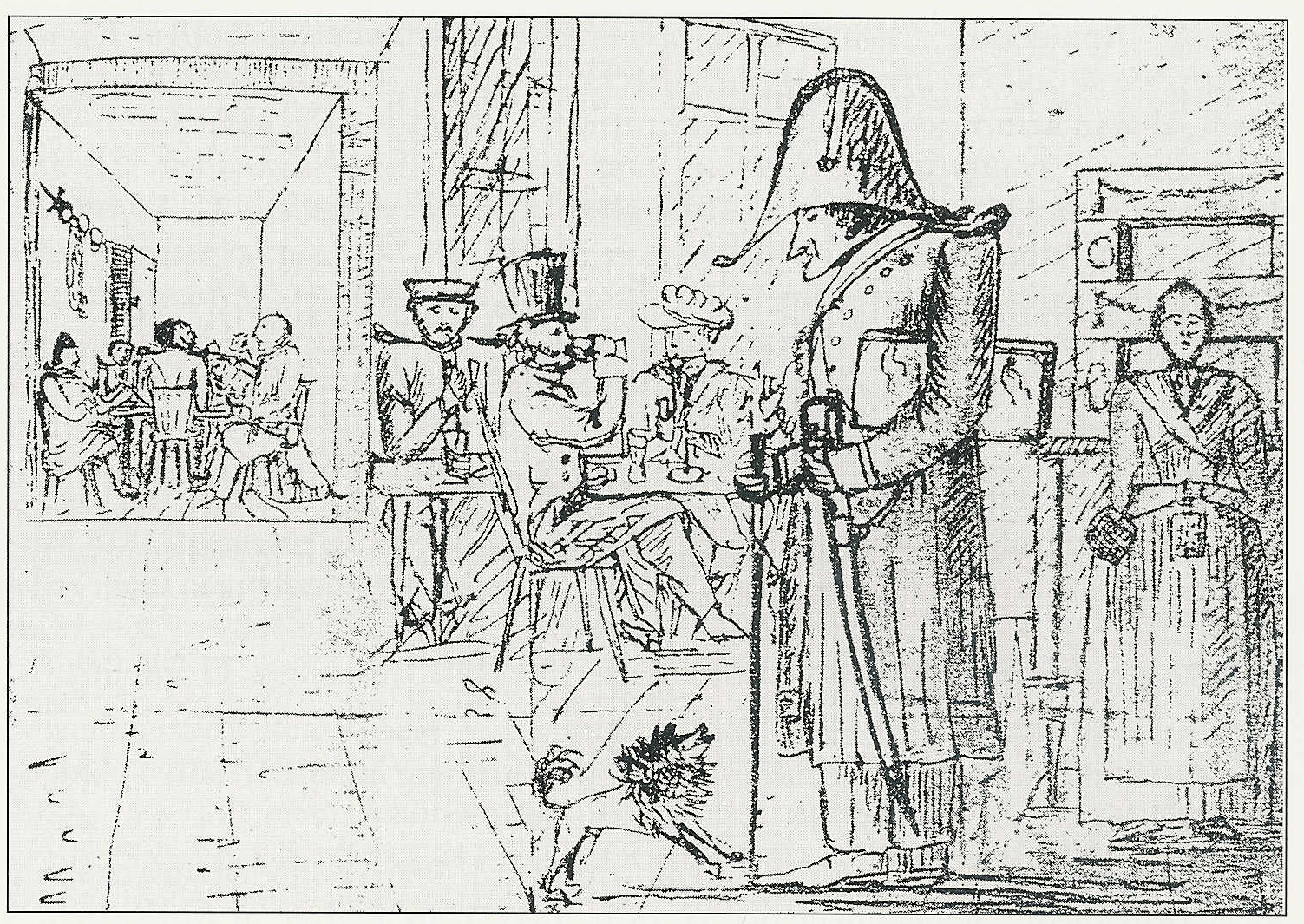
Johann Friedrich Payer (1775-1851), Oberpedell ("Chief Pedell") in Tübingen, Germany, checks the behaviour of students in a pub.

The Pedell at German universities would also function as a notary, and had a relatively prominent position. At the University of Tübingen, the Pedell was responsible both for arresting and detaining students in the karzer and for acting as prosecutor in the university court.

In universities in the Netherlands the pedel acts as a master of ceremonies. As of 2005 the office is an entirely ceremonial one, the pedel leading public processions and acting as the master of ceremonies at opening of the academic year, the dies natalis, inaugural and farewell addresses of full professors, graduations and Ph.D. examinations. As a master of ceremonies, the pedel is largely mute. The only words that a pedel utters in public are "Hora Est", announcing that the allotted time for a Ph.D. examination has expired.

At the University of Uppsala in Sweden the function of pedell is mentioned for the first time in the statutes of 1626, with a function similar to that of the cursor; in Uppsala there were several pedells, one of which was each morning to appear in front of the rector, serve him at official functions and hold the silver sceptre of the university. He was also to keep a ledger over the students and keep guard over incarcerated students. The pedell at Uppsala wore a richly decorated livery in blue and yellow with silver embroidery, and carried a wooden staff with a silver button.

== Beadle ==
The word Beadle, the name for various similar but not identical offices in Scotland and England, is of the same origin.

== Bidello ==
The Italian word bidello, the person whose work is to check classrooms and schedules and, in the past, to signal the end of the class, has the same origin. The function of announcing the end of each hour-long lesson by uttering the word finis (Latin for "end") has long been abandoned due to the introduction of electrical bells and public address systems.
