= Robert Tabor =

English physician

- Born: 1642? Cambridgeshire
- Died: November 1681
- Occupation: Physician

Sir Robert Tabor, or Talbor, (1642? – November 1681) was an English physician.

== Biography ==
Tabor born in Cambridgeshire in 1642 or 1643. He was the son of John Tabor, registrar to the bishop of Ely and grandson of James Tabor, registrar of Cambridge University. In early life he was apprenticed to a Cambridge apothecary named Dent. In this position he devoted his attention to improving the methods of administering quinine or jesuits' bark as a cure for fever. At that time the after-effects of the drug rendered it an extremely dangerous remedy. To study its operation better Tabor removed to a marshy district in Essex, where fevers were prevalent. There he perfected his method of cure. Though he shrouded his remedy in considerable mystery, and disguised its nature by mixing it with other drugs, the merit of his system lay in the fact that he administered the quinine in smaller quantities and at more frequent intervals than had been customary. He published the results of his researches in a work entitled 'Πυρετολογία, a Rational Account of the Cause and Cure of Agues; whereunto is added a Short Account of the Cause and Cure of Feavers,' London, 1672, 8vo. Notwithstanding opposition from rival practitioners, his remedy soon became famous. According to Edward Sheffield, marquis of Normanby, Tabor was happy enough to save Charles II's life when it was threatened by a dangerous ague. Richard Lower (1631–1691) refused to sanction the trial of the remedy, but, on the intervention of Thomas Short (1635-1685), Tabor was permitted to make the experiment, and was completely successful (Evelyn, Diary, 29 Nov. 1695). In consequence he was appointed one of the king's physicians in ordinary, and was knighted at Whitehall on 27 July 1678. About this time he proceeded to France by order of Charles and cured the dauphin of an ague. His remedy was known there as 'the Englishman's cure.' Louis XIV treated him with great consideration, invited him to settle in France, and, when he declined, purchased the secret of his treatment from him. In 1679 he proceeded to Spain to attend the queen, Louisa Maria (Lettres de Mme. de Sevigné, 1738, iv. 272). He died in November 1681, and was buried on the 17th in Trinity Church, Cambridge, in the north chapel, where a monument was erected to him. On 17 February 1678–9 he married Elizabeth Aylet of Rivenhall, Essex, at St. Matthew's, Friday Street, London. By her he had a son, an officer in the army, known as 'Handsome Tabor.'
