= Thomas Short =

Thomas Short may refer to:

- Thomas Short (physician, died 1685) (1635–1685), English physician
- Thomas Short (physician, died 1772) (1690?–1772), Scottish physician
- Thomas Vowler Short (1790–1872), English academic and clergyman
