= General Meredith =

General Meredith may refer to:

- John Meredith (general) (1864–1942), Australian Imperial Force brigadier general
- Solomon Meredith (1810–1875)

== See also ==
- Thomas Meredyth (died 1719) (after 1661–1719), British Army lieutenant general
