= Matthew Whinn =

Matthew Whinn (1612-1683) was the sixth recorded Registrary of the University of Cambridge.

Mere was born in Cambridge. He entered St John's College, Cambridge in 1630. He graduated B.A. in 1634 and M.A. in 1637. He also became the university printer in 1669.

Academic offices
Preceded by James Tabor	Cambridge University Registrary; 1645–1683	Succeeded by James Halman
