= Stephen Fleet =

Stephen George Fleet (28 September 1936 – 18 May 2006) was a Master of Downing College, Cambridge, the Cambridge University Registrary and a researcher in mineral sciences and crystallography.

Stephen Fleet was educated at Brentwood School, Essex, Lewes County Grammar School, Sussex and St John's College, Cambridge, where he received his doctorate. His research fields were the crystal structure of minerals, particularly phase transformations in minerals and meteorites.

In 1963 Fleet moved to Fitzwilliam House and was a founding fellow when Fitzwilliam achieved collegiate status in 1966. In 1974 he moved to Downing College as bursar and fellow and later served the college as Vice-Master (1985–1987, 1991–1994 and 1997–2000) and as Master from 2000 to 2003. Between 1983 and 1997 Fleet was the University Registrary, the chief administrative officer of the university.

He died from cancer at the Hammersmith Hospital, London on 18 May 2006.

Academic offices
Preceded by David King	Master of Downing College, Cambridge; 2000–2003	Succeeded by Barry Everitt
Preceded by Roderick Ewen Macpherson	Cambridge University Registrary; 1983–1987	Succeeded by Timothy John Mead
