= Second Army (Australia) =

1942-1946 army-level field formation of the Australian Army

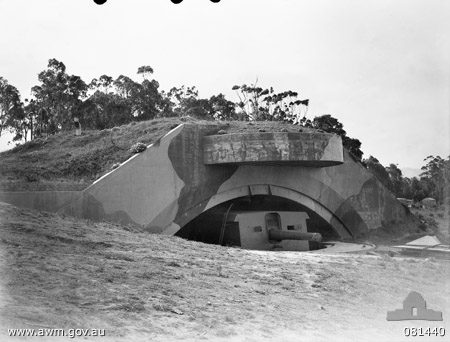
- Kembla Fortress area, Drummond Battery
- Active: 1942–1946
- Country: Australia
- Branch: Australian Army
- Type: Field Army
- Engagements: World War II: Home front

Commanders
- Notable commanders: Iven Mackay; Leslie Morshead; Herbert Lloyd

Insignia
- Unit colour patch

The Second Army was a field army of the Australian Army, during World War II. Raised in April 1942 from the existing HQ Home Forces, the formation remained in Australia throughout the war and was responsible for commanding forces in the Australian eastern states. Initially, the formation controlled several divisions, including several US formations; however, as the focus of the Allied war effort shifted north the formation was reduced in size over 1943. Throughout 1944 and 1945, the formation's combat forces were greatly reduced and eventually it became a largely training and line of communications headquarters. The war ended in August 1945, and the formation ceased to exist in early 1946.

== History ==
The formation was created in February 1942, initially with the designation of HQ Home Forces, which was established at Ivanhoe, Victoria. It had been planned that the formation would move to Tamworth, New South Wales, but a reorganisation in April 1942 took place and the move was cancelled. At this time, the formation's designation was changed to Second Army, when the commander of Allied land forces in the South West Pacific Area, General Thomas Blamey, gave it responsibility for land forces in the Australia's most populous areas: Victoria, South Australia and Tasmania, subsuming Southern Command. On 9 May 1942, the war diary maintained by the formation's headquarters began referring to itself as the "Second Aust Army", although a subsequent entry in the same document for 29 May refers to the "Second Australian Army".

Initially, the Second Army consisted of the 2nd Motor Division and the Victoria Covering Force in Melbourne, the US 41st Infantry Division in Seymour, Victoria, and the 12th Brigade Group (which formed Tasmania Force). The US 32nd Infantry Division was also assigned in April 1942, but had not arrived in Australia at the time. Upon arrival, the 32nd were established in Adelaide, South Australia. In May 1942, the formation moved to Mount Martha, Victoria. Responsibility for central and southern New South Wales was assumed in August 1942, as a result of the movement of forces to Queensland and Western Australia. This included the US divisions which were shifted to Queensland prior to their commitment to the fighting in New Guinea. After assuming control of the 1st, 10th and 1st Motor Divisions, the formation's headquarters moved to Parramatta, New South Wales, where it would remain until eventually disbanded after the war. The 10th Division was disbanded in September 1942, and at the end of the year the 1st Motor Division reorganised as an armoured formation (designated the 3rd Armoured Division), and was moved to Queensland, where it came under control of the First Australian Army.

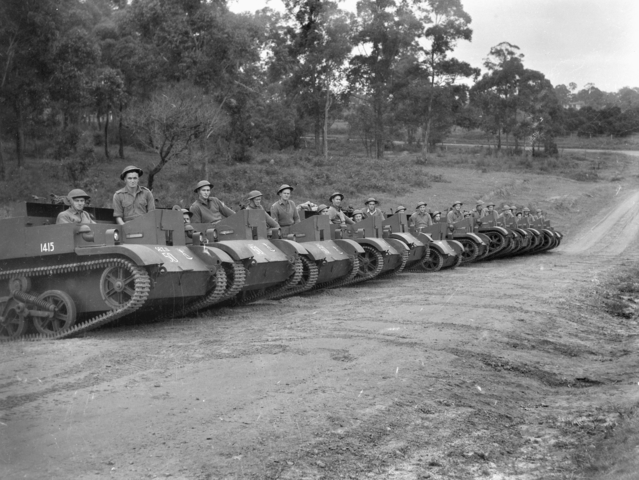
Bren carriers at Sydney in 1943

In April 1943, the formation was reorganised and Land Headquarters assumed responsibility for Tasmania and South Australia, while gaining responsibility for a number of anti-aircraft assets in New South Wales and Victoria. The formation oversaw the defence of several key areas in New South Wales including Sydney, Port Kembla, and Newcastle at this time, and also assumed responsibility for southern-based training and logistical support units. The 2nd Armoured Division, which had been formed from the 2nd Motor Division, was disbanded in mid-1943, and in May three fortress units were raised from the troops around Newcastle, Sydney and Port Kembla. As the focus of the war shifted in the Allies' favour, the forces remaining in Australia were reduced as forces were deployed north to New Guinea and elsewhere, and by August–September 1943, the formation consisted only of the Australian 1st Division, made up of the 1st, 9th and 28th Brigades.

In late 1943, the formation consisted of 102,593 troops, with a further 74,115 personnel assigned to the two lines of communications areas within its assigned boundaries. These troops came under the Second Army for operational purposes, but were administered separately by Land Headquarters. However, due to manpower shortages elsewhere in the Australian military, the government pushed for further reductions in early 1944. The army's headquarters element had initially consisted of 842 personnel when the formation was raised in 1942 but by 1944 it had fallen to 494. By February 1944, Second Army's role was reduced to the defence of Sydney, while the fixed defences under the formation's command – the fortress units – were reduced and reorganised into a single headquarters, designated HQ Fixed Defences. The covering force assigned to Victoria was disbanded in April 1944 and two months later the 1st Division's strength fell to just one brigade. With this, the formation was reduced largely to a training and line of communications role, although its headquarters was maintained as a contingency, or to provide reinforcement to other deployed senior headquarters as required. From September 1944, Second Army assumed responsibility for south-east Queensland as well. This situation remained until the end of the war.

Nevertheless, the formation's strength continued to decline. By the end of 1944, the total number of troops assigned to the Second Army had dropped to just 34,749, with the majority (over 25,000) being assigned to training establishments, and another 1,000 at various schools. Throughout the final months of the war, a proposal was formulated to re-designate the formation as "Training Command", but this was rendered unnecessary by the end of the war in August. After the end of hostilities, the formation's remaining units were gradually disbanded, with the last units demobilising in November and December 1945, or being transferred to various line of communications headquarters in Queensland, New South Wales and Victoria. In January 1946, the Second Army ceased to exist.

== Order of Battle ==
Upon formation in April 1942, the Second Army consisted of the following formations:

- 2nd Motor Division
- Victoria Covering Force
- US 41st Infantry Division
- US 32nd Infantry Division (joining/arriving)
- 12th Brigade Group

By August 1943, the formation had been reduced to the following:

- 1st Division
  - 1st Brigade
  - 9th Brigade
  - 28th Brigade

== Commanders ==
Second Army was initially commanded by Lieutenant General Iven Mackay. In January 1944, the position passed to Lieutenant General Leslie Morshead; he remained until July 1944. That month, Major General Herbert Lloyd assumed administrative command, and he remained in the position until January 1946.

== Bibliography ==
- Dexter, David (1961). The New Guinea Offensives. Australia in the War of 1939–1945. Series 1 – Army. Vol. VI. Canberra: Australian War Memorial. OCLC 2028994.
- Long, Gavin (1963). The Final Campaigns. Australia in the War of 1939–1945. Series 1 – Army. Vol. VII. Canberra: Australian War Memorial. OCLC 1297619.
- McCarthy, Dudley (1959). South-West Pacific Area – First Year. Australia in the War of 1939–1945. Series 1 – Army. Vol. V. Canberra: Australian War Memorial. OCLC 3134247.
- McKenzie-Smith, Graham (2018). The Unit Guide: The Australian Army 1939–1945, Volume 2. Warriewood, New South Wales: Big Sky Publishing. ISBN 978-1-925675-146.
