= Jonathan Nicholls =

Registrary of the University of Cambridge

Jonathan William Nicholas Nicholls (16 June 1956 – 13 March 2022) was the Registrary of the University of Cambridge from October 2007. He retired from this post at the end of 2016, at which point Emma Rampton became Acting Registrary.

Nicholls was educated at Culford School, the University of Bristol (first-class English degree, 1978), and Emmanuel College, Cambridge (PhD, English, 1984). He was a Herchel Smith Scholar at Harvard. His career began at the University of Warwick, where he was appointed registrar, moving to the University of Birmingham in 2004. He was a non-executive director of Graduate Prospects, and a member of both the national Joint Negotiating Committee for Higher Education Staff and the advisory board of the Institute for Higher Education Policy.

Nicholls, who was a Labour member of Warwick District Council, died following a car accident on 13 March 2022.
