= James Tabor (Registrary) =

Registrary of the University of Cambridge (died 1645)

James Tabor, D.D. was the fifth recorded Registrary of the University of Cambridge from 1600 until his death.

Mere was born in Essex. He entered Corpus Christi College, Cambridge in 1593. He graduated B.A. in 1597 and M.A. in 1600. He was Clerk of the Sewers for the town of Cambridge. He died on 16 July 1645. His grandson was the physician Robert Tabor.

Academic offices
Preceded by Thomas Smith	Cambridge University Registrary; 1600–1645	Succeeded by Matthew Whinn
