= George Borlase =

George Borlase (1743 – 7 November 1809) was an English churchman, Registrary and Knightbridge Professor of Moral Philosophy at the University of Cambridge.

== Life and career ==
George Borlase was born 1743 in Cornwall. He was the sixth son of Walter Borlase, vicar of Madron, and his wife Margaret. After attending a grammar school in Exeter, he was admitted to Peterhouse, Cambridge in 1759 at the age of 16. He graduated from the Mathematical Tripos in 1764. He subsequently became Fellow of Peterhouse in 1766, and in February 1778 was elected Registrary to the university. After taking his BD in 1780 he began his career in the church, first as vicar of Little St Mary's, Cambridge, 1773–89 then as rector of Newton, Suffolk, 1790–1809 and finally as Vicar of Cherry Hinton in 1789. Borlase was nominated for the Mastership of Peterhouse, but after a contested election against Barnes he was rejected. He was elected Professor of Casuistry in 1788. He never gave any lectures and held his church posts as well as being registrary at the same time.

Borlase is most well known for being the first editor of a list of the graduates at Cambridge University between 1659 and 1787, known as the Cantabrigienses Graduati (London, 1787). He also contributed to the second edition of the Biographia Britannica.

Borlase married Henrietta Serocold, daughter of the Reverend George Serocold in 1791. His second wife was Anne, daughter of the Reverend Thomas Holme, whom he married in 1800.

He died on 7 November 1809, aged 67.

Academic offices
Preceded by Henry Hubbard	Cambridge University Registrary; 1778–1809	Succeeded by William August Pemberton
