= Karzer =

Punishment room in German universities

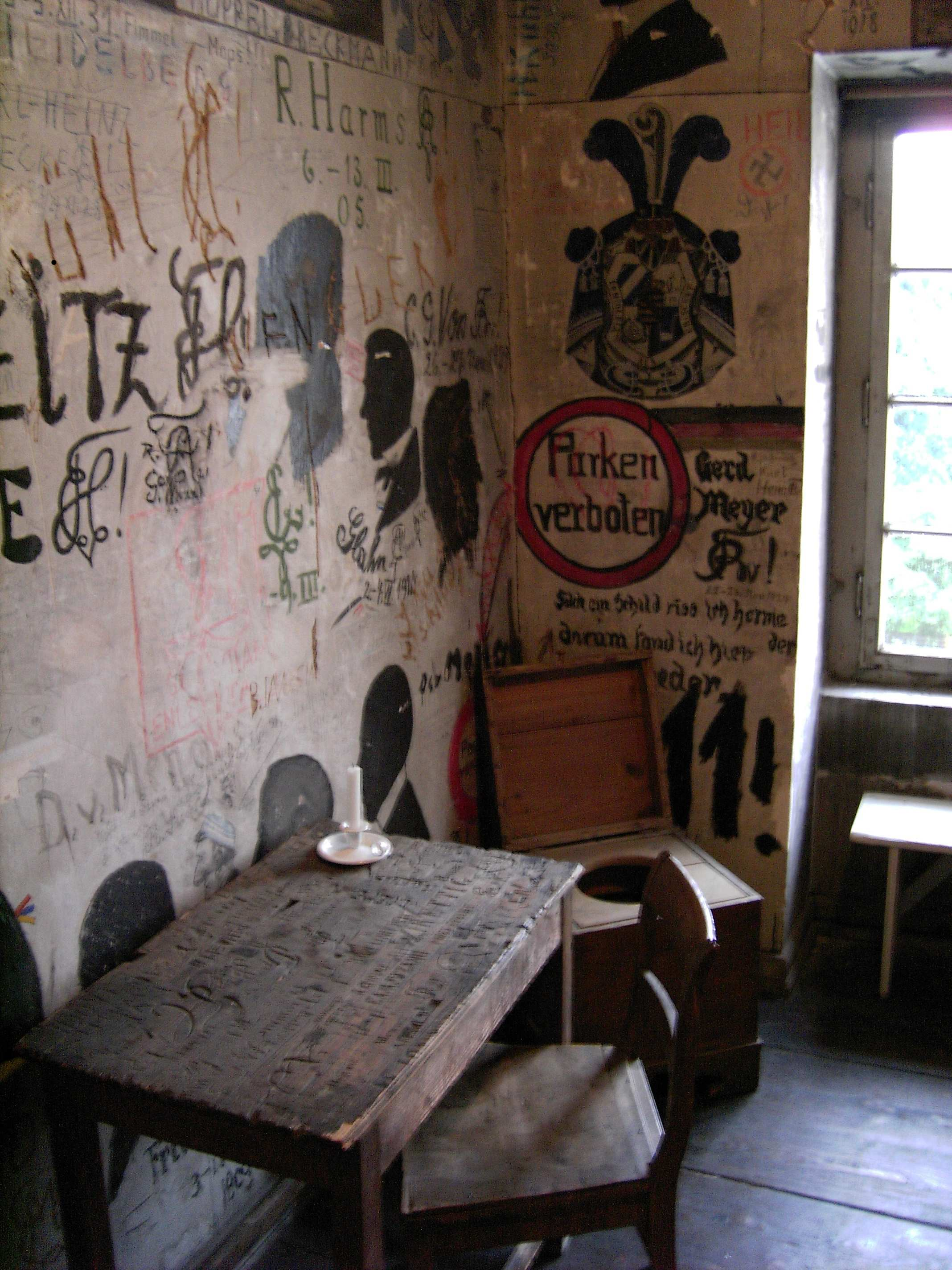
The Karzer at Göttingen University

A Karzer was a designated lock-up or detention room to incarcerate students as a punishment, within the jurisdiction of some institutions of learning in Germany and German-language universities abroad. The American writer Mark Twain wrote about the karzer in Heidelberg in his book, A Tramp Abroad (1880).

Karzers existed both at universities and at gymnasiums (similar to a grammar school) in Germany until the beginning of the 20th century. Marburg's last Karzer inmate, for example, was registered as late as 1931.

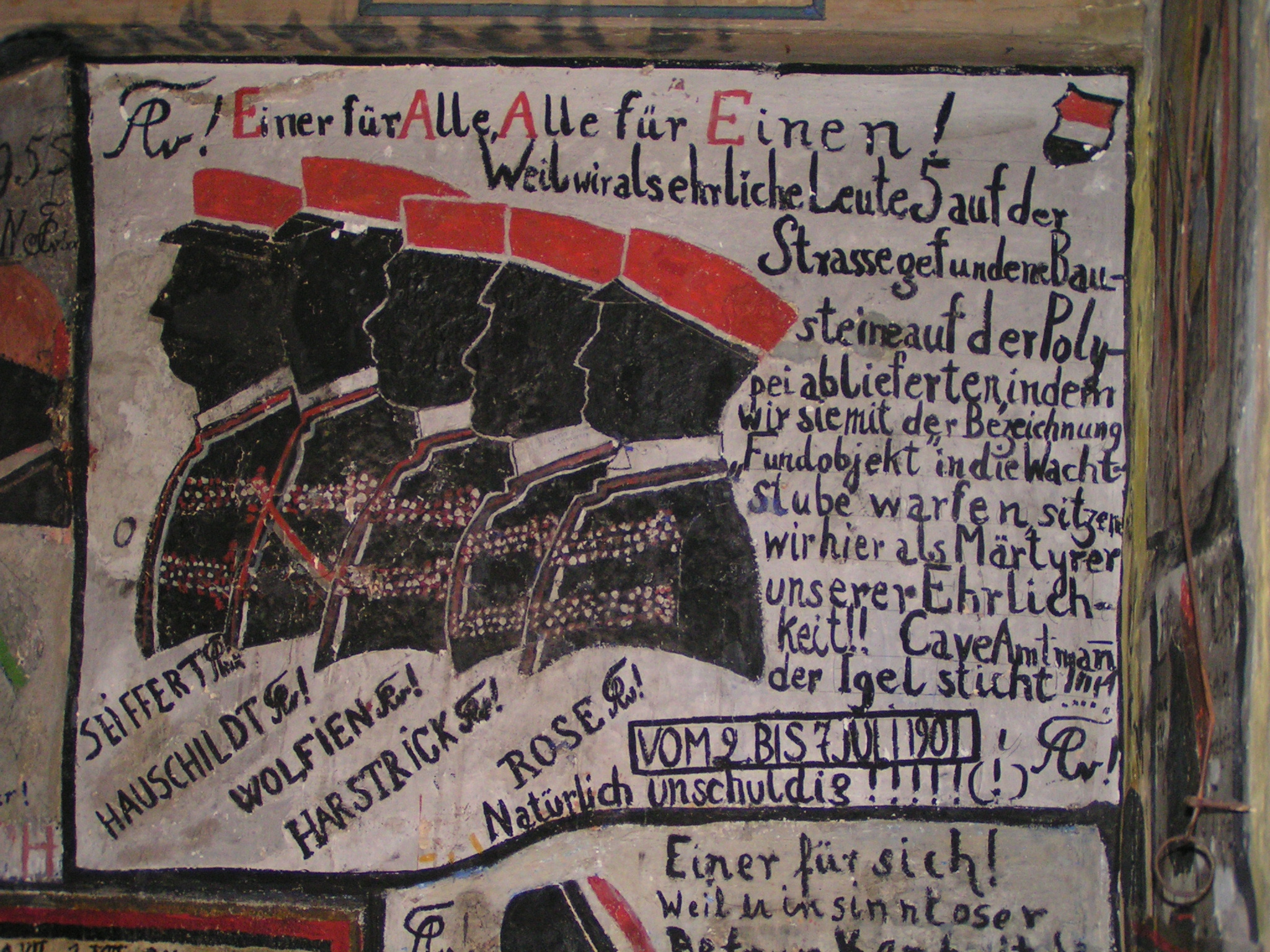
Graffiti in the Heidelberg Karzer

Responsible for the administration of the Karzer was the so-called Pedell (English: bedel), or during later times Karzerwärter (a warden). While Karzer arrest was originally a severe punishment, the respect for this punishment diminished with time, particularly in the 19th century, as it paradoxically became a badge of honour of sorts to have been incarcerated at least once during one's time at university. At the end of the 19th century, as the students in the cell became responsible for their own food and drink and the receiving of visitors became permitted, the "punishment" would often turn into a social occasion with excessive consumption of alcohol.

Karzers have been preserved at the universities of Heidelberg, Jena, Bonn, Marburg, Tübingen, Freiberg, Greifswald, Göttingen, Friedrich-Alexander-Universität Erlangen-Nürnberg in Erlangen, and at Tartu, Estonia. The Karzer in Göttingen was known, after the Pedell Brühbach, as Hotel de Brühbach; it was moved in the 19th century, because of the extension of the university library, to the Aula building; a cell door, preserved from the old Karzer, shows graffiti by Otto von Bismarck. Bearing witness to how the students spent the time in the cell are the many memorable wall, table and door graffiti left by students in the cells and today shown as tourist attractions in the older German universities.

== Wartime use ==
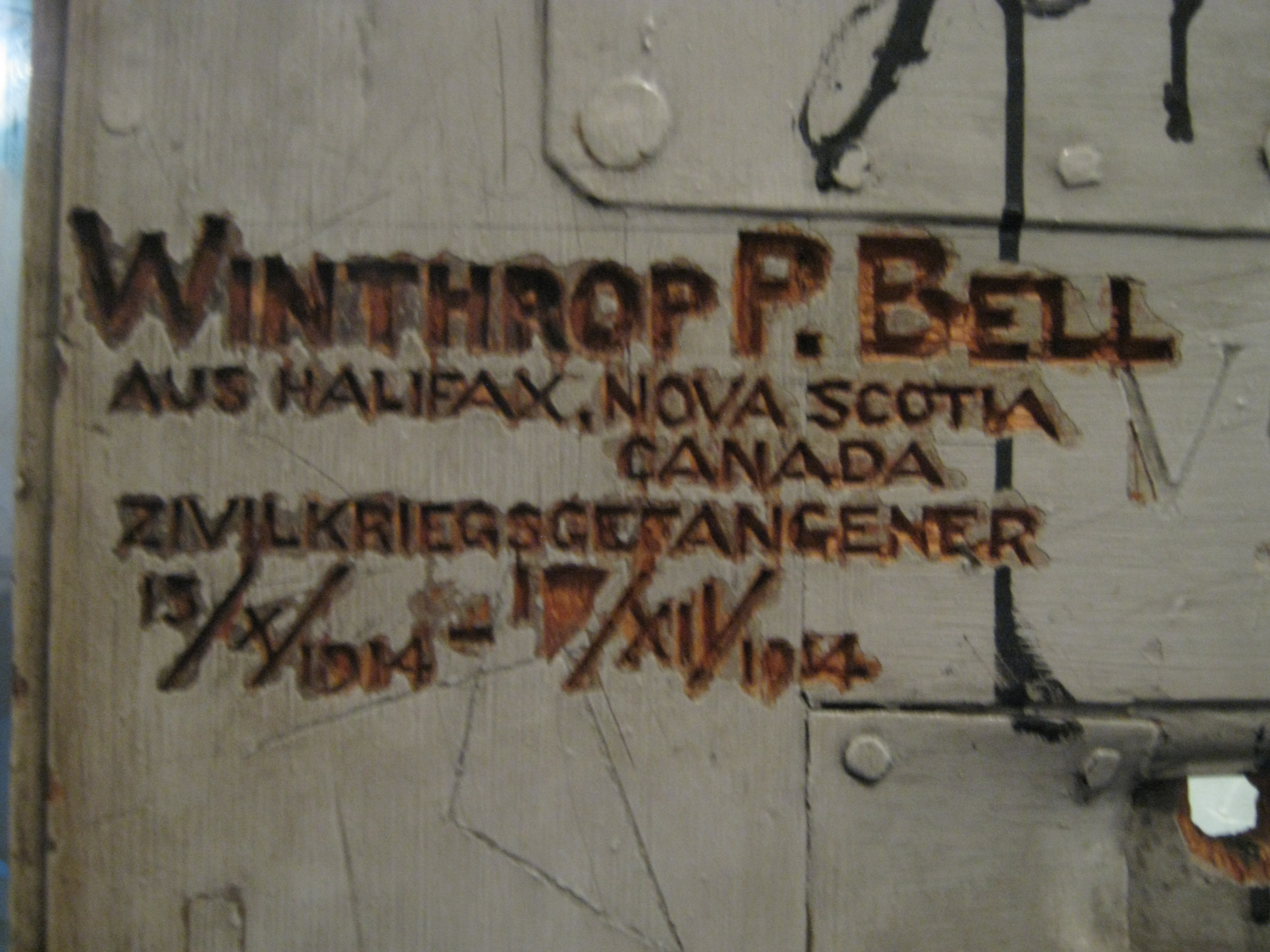
Engraving by Winthrop Pickard Bell on a cell door in the Karzer of the University of Göttingen

At the start of World War I, the Canadian philosophy student Winthrop Pickard Bell, who was attending Göttingen to study under Edmund Husserl, was detained for several months as a potential belligerent. He spent most of the war at Ruhleben internment camp.
