= John Meredith (general) =

Australian Army officer (1864–1942)

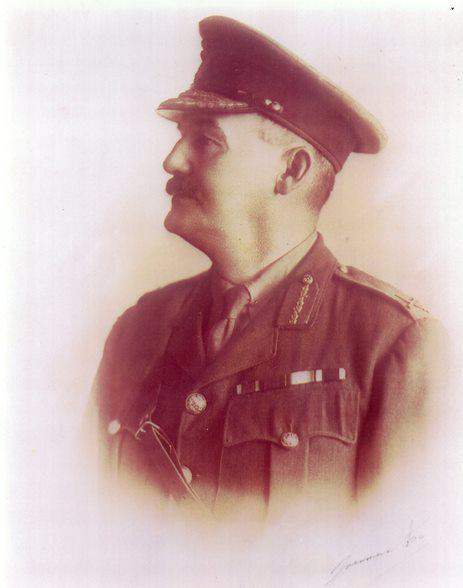
- Born: John Baldwin Hoystead Meredith; 11 November 1864; Derrylough, Queen's County, Ireland
- Died: 1 January 1942 (aged 77); Maitland, New South Wales, Australia
- Relatives: Sir Iven Mackay (son-in-law)
- Military career
- Allegiance: Australia
- Branch: Citizens Military Force
- Service years: 1899–1923
- Rank: Brigadier General
- Commands: 2nd Cavalry Brigade (1921–23); 4th Light Horse Brigade (1917); 1st Light Horse Regiment (1914–17); 6th Light Horse Regiment (1912–14); 4th Light Horse Regiment (1910–12)
- Conflicts: Second Boer War; First World War; Gallipoli Campaign; Sinai and Palestine Campaign; Battle of Romani; Second Battle of Gaza
- Awards: Distinguished Service Order; Colonial Auxiliary Forces Officers' Decoration; Mentioned in Despatches; Officer of the Order of the White Eagle (Serbia)

Brigadier General John Baldwin Hoystead Meredith, DSO VD (11 November 1864 – 1 January 1942) was an Australian physician and a senior officer in the Australian Imperial Force during the First World War.

== Early life and career ==
John Baldwin Hoystead Meredith was born on 11 November 1864 in Derrylough, Queen's County, Ireland, the seventh child of William Meredith, a landowner, and his wife Anne Harte Meredith, née Hoystead. He was educated at Arlington College, Port Arlington. Unable to afford an army commission, he studied medicine in Dublin from 1882 to 1887 under auspices of the Royal College of Surgeons in Ireland. In 1888 he qualified as a licentiate of the Royal College of Surgeons and Physicians, Edinburgh, and of the Faculty of Physicians and Surgeons, Glasgow. Meredith decided to try for a passage to one of the colonies as a ship's doctor. He immigrated to Australia in 1888, where he bought a practice at Raymond Terrace in New South Wales. This practice was known as "The Bungalow", and had a doctors practice on the first level and his residence on the second. His fiancée, Harriett Eveline Waters of Kildare, arrived two years later, and they were married on the day she landed, 20 May 1890, in St Philip's Anglican Church, Sydney. Harriet was prevented by her father from leaving Ireland, but after he passed she left for Australia. They had three children.

Meredith became a government medical officer and joined the Hunter River Light Horse. In 1899 he volunteered for served in the Second Boer War in South Africa, serving as a medical officer in the Citizen's Bushmen's Contingent. In 1905 as a second lieutenant, Meredith formed a troop of light horse at Raymond Terrance which became part of the 4th Light Horse Regiment. He was promoted to captain in 1906 and major in 1908. In 1908 he took his family to England and Ireland, where he was attached to the 18th Hussars in Ireland for training. In 1910 after returning to Australia, he took command of the 4th Light Horse Regiment. He was promoted to lieutenant colonel and took command of the 6th Light Horse Regiment in 1912. On 4 September 1914 his daughter Marjorie married Captain Iven Mackay.

== First World War ==
On 28 August 1914, Meredith joined the Australian Imperial Force as commander of the 1st Light Horse Regiment as a lieutenant colonel. He served with the regiment at Gallipoli from 22 August 1915 until the evacuation. From 6 to 29 December 1915 he was acting commander of the 1st Light Horse Brigade.

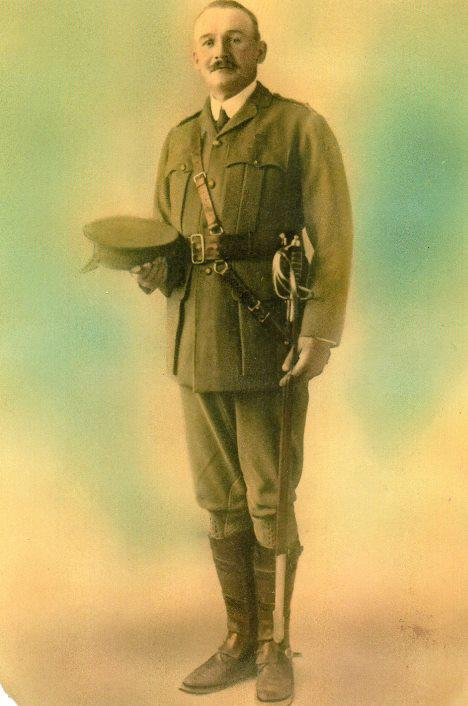

The 1st Light Horse regiment arrived back in Alexandria on 27 December 1915 and on 14 January 1916 was ordered to join the Western Frontier Force, defending the Sudan against the Senussi. On 5 May, Meredith once again took over command of the 1st Light Horse Brigade when Brigadier General Charles Cox went to England on sick leave, holding the rank of colonel while in command of the brigade. Meredith commanded the 1st Light Horse Brigade at the Battle of Romani in early August 1916, when his men fought off a series of Turkish attacks. He relinquished command the brigade on 26 August 1916 and reverted to the rank of lieutenant colonel. For his role in this battle, Meredith was mentioned in despatches and awarded the Distinguished Service Order (DSO) and, in February 1917, the Serbian Officer of the Order of the White Eagle.

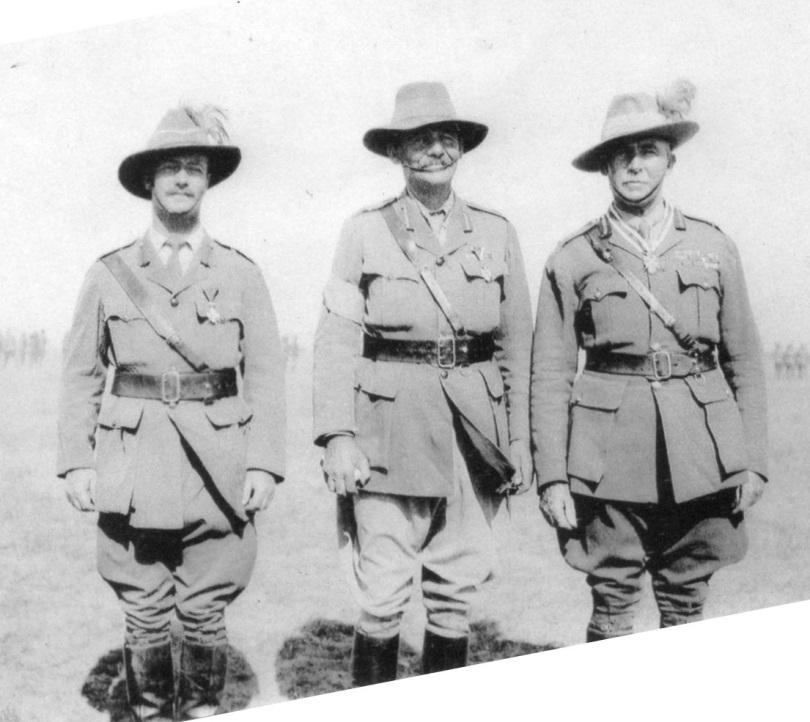

On 2 September 1916, Meredith departed for Australia on a three months furlough, arriving in late September. He left Australia for Egypt again on 9 December 1916, sailing from Melbourne and arriving back at Suez on 19 January 1917. On 13 February 1917, Meredith took over the newly reformed 4th Light Horse Brigade. He was made a temporary brigadier general on that date and was then promoted to full colonel on 1 May 1917. He led his brigade at the Second Battle of Gaza in April 1917 but on the eve of the Battle of Beersheba in October 1917, he was forced to return to Australia for family reasons. He boarded the transport on 12 November 1917 and arrived back in Australia on 20 December 1917, where his appointment to the AIF was terminated on 3 January 1918.

== Post war ==
Meredith commanded the 2nd Cavalry Brigade from 1921 to 1923, when he retired as honorary brigadier general.

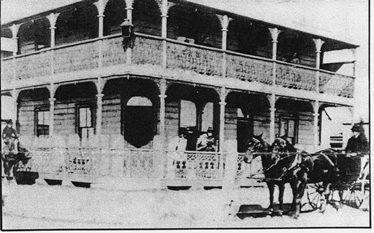
Practice of Dr Meredith in Raymond Terrace

He started a medical practice and developed a Jersey stud, later becoming vice-president of the Jersey Herd Society of New South Wales.

In 1919, Harriett died from influenza while Meredith was on another house call. She was cremated at Beresfield Crematorium.

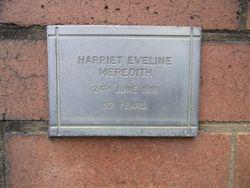
Grave of Mrs Harriett Meredith at Beresfield Crematorium

Two years later, he married 20-year-old Alice Christina Mowbray Windeyer on 19 October 1921, at St. John's Anglican Church, Raymond Terrace. Alice was the daughter of Mr Archibald James Windeyer and Mrs Alice Gordon Croudace of Kinross, Raymond Terrace. They had five children, four of whom survived to adulthood.

Meredith died at Maitland Hospital on the New Year's Day of 1942, at the age of 77, and was cremated at Beresfield Crematorium. He was survived by a son and two daughters of his first marriage, and by his wife and four young sons. His widow and children resided in Kinross until Alice's death in 1966.

== Issue ==
From his two marriages, Meredith had eight children. By Harriett;

1. Marjorie Eveline Meredith (1891-1987). Married in 1914 to Sir Iven Giffard Mackay. Three children.
2. Muriel Windeyer Meredith (1892-1983). Married William Hooke Mackay in 1913, divorce in 1934. No children.
3. Dr John Baldwin Waters Meredith (1895-1956). Married Lois Cecil-Jack in 1924. Two children.

From Alice-

1. Elizabeth Mowbray (1922-1922). Died aged six weeks.
2. William Archibald Meredith (1924-2004). Married Mollie Rye. Four children.
3. Neville Windeyer Meredith (1929-2010). Married Merle Irene Hulmes. Two children.
4. James Baldwin Meredith (1930-1994). Married and had two children.
5. Thomas Gordon Meredith (1939-2017). Married Merle Noelene Colley and had four children.
