= Dies natalis =

Dies natalis is Latin for "birthday, anniversary" and may refer to:

- The birthday of an individual, or the anniversary of a founding of a temple; see Glossary of ancient Roman religion#dies natalis
  - Dies Natalis Solis Invicti, the "birthday" of the Roman solar deity Sol Invictus on December 25
- the annual commemoration of a Christian martyr's death; see Calendar of saints
- Dies Natalis (cantata), a cantata by Gerald Finzi
