= Thomas Short (physician, died 1685) =

English physician

- Born: 1635; Easton, Suffolk
- Died: 28 September 1685 (aged 49–50)
- Occupation: Physician

Thomas Short (1635 – 28 September 1685) was an English physician.

== Biography ==
Short son of the Rev. William Short. He was born at Easton, Suffolk, in 1635. He was sent to the grammar school of Bury St. Edmunds, and thence to St. John's College, Cambridge, where he was admitted a sizar on 25 February 1649–50, aged 14 (Mayor, Admissions, i. 94). He graduated B.A. in 1653, and was created M.D. by royal mandate on 26 June 1668. He settled in London and was admitted a candidate at the College of Physicians in December 1668, but was not elected a fellow till 26 July 1675. He had joined the church of Rome, and, in accordance with an order of the House of Lords for the ejection of Roman Catholics, was summoned to attend a meeting of the College of Physicians on 14 April 1679. He did so, but the feeling of the college was against intolerant proceedings; a quorum was not present, and no steps were taken. He attained considerable practice, and Thomas Sydenham, who had met him in consultation, found his ‘genius disposed for the practice of physick’ (Works, ed. Pechey, 1729, p. 339), and praises both his learning and sagacity. Sydenham prefixed to ‘A Treatise of the Gout and Dropsy’ a letter to Short in which occurs a famous passage on posthumous fame which Fielding quoted in ‘Tom Jones.’ Short died on 28 September 1685, and is buried in St. James's Chapel, London. Bishop Burnet, who thought that Charles II died of poison, also believed that Short was poisoned by his co-religionists for asserting that the king was poisoned (Own Time, i. 609). Richard Lower and Walter Needham seem to have been unable to resist an opportunity of imposing upon the whig historian's credulity.
