= Registrary =

The Registrary is the senior administrative officer of the University of Cambridge. The term is unique to Cambridge, and uses an archaic spelling. Most universities in the United Kingdom and in North America have administrative offices entitled "registrar" or "the registry", although typically with substantially less official responsibility than the Cambridge post.

At Cambridge, the Registrary is also Secretary to the University Council. As the head of the university's Unified Administrative Service, the Registrary is responsible for the central management and the non-academic services of the university. The Registrary has control of the University Chest (formerly a physical chest in which the funds of the university were held secure, now a metaphor for the university's bank accounts). The actual chest is still kept in the Registrary's office. It is over 600 years old and is locked with 17 locks. The previous chest was burned in the Cambridge Peasants' Revolt of 1381. Until the 14th century, the university's books were also kept in the chest.

The office of the Registrary was established in 1506, to compile and maintain the records of the university. The office has been held by only 26 persons in continuous succession since that date. Many early registraries held, or had held, the office of Esquire Bedell. Currently an interim Registrary, the Academic Secretary Mike Glover, is in position following the resignation of Emma Rampton as Registrary at the end of December 2025.

== List of Registraries ==
- 1506 Robert Hobbs (Hobys)
- 1543 John Mere
- 1558 Matthew Stokys (Stokes)
- 1591 Thomas Smith
- 1600 James Tabor
- 1645 Matthew Whinn
- 1683 James Halman
- 1701 Robert Grove
- 1725 Lancelot Newton
- 1734 John Taylor
- 1751 Lynford Caryl
- 1758 Henry Hubbard
- 1778 George Borlase
- 1809 William Augustus Pemberton
- 1816 William Hustler
- 1832 Joseph Romilly
- 1862 Henry Richards Luard
- 1891 John Willis Clark
- 1910 John Neville Keynes
- 1925 Ernest Harrison
- 1943 Walter Wyatt Grave
- 1953 Robert Mantle Rattenbury
- 1969 Roderick Ewen Macpherson
- 1983 Stephen George Fleet
- 1997 Timothy John Mead
- 2007 Jonathan Nicholls
- 2017 Emma Rampton
- 2026 Mike Glover (Academic Secretary, acting as interim Registrary)

== Subordinate posts ==
The office of Assistant Registrary was established in 1885, and until 1926 it was a fixed term appointment of three years. A Second Assistant Registrary was added in 1920, and a Third Assistant in 1921. In April 1961 the posts were renamed as Deputy Registrary and Deputy Secretary General, Senior Assistant Registrary, and Assistant Registrary.

== See also ==
- Registrar of the University of Oxford
- Deborah Prentice § Vice-chancellor of the University of Cambridge
