= Esquire Bedell =

Ceremonial administrative position at a university

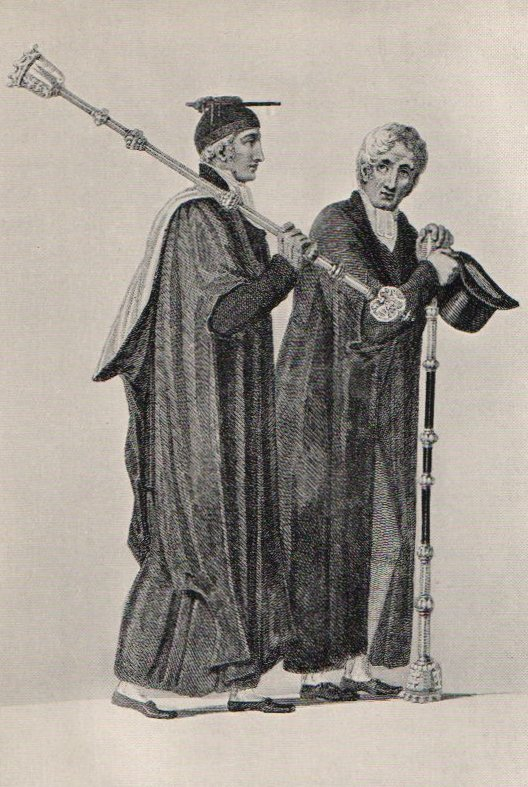
1815 engraving (from Rudolf Ackermann's History of the University of Cambridge) of an Esquire Bedell (left) and a Yeoman Bedell (right).

An Esquire Bedell is a junior ceremonial officer of a university, usually with official duties relating to the conduct of ceremonies for the conferment of degrees. The word is closely related to the archaic bedel and modern English beadle.

== History ==
The University of Cambridge historically had a beadle (usher) assisting with official ceremonies as well as being an administrative assistant of the chancellor and the proctors. The title of Gentleman Bedell, similar in status to a Gentleman Usher, was in use by 1392. The title Esquire Bedell was first used in 1473 and formally recognised in the university statutes by Edward VI in 1549.

The principal bedell was assisted in both administrative and ceremonial duties by a secondary or sub-bedell. By the 15th century this position was given the somewhat demeaning title of "inferior bedell", but granted the title of Yeoman Bedell by Edward VI in 1549. Yeomen at the time were often constables and bailiffs. A Yeoman Bedell performed similar duties at the university, including collecting fines at the time when universities had their own jurisdiction over students. The Yeoman Bedell could also perform the duties of a crier.

== By country ==
Esquires Bedell are primarily associated with universities in the Commonwealth.

In Australia, the Australian National University, the University of Melbourne, the University of Sydney, the University of New England, Monash University and others retain the position of Esquire Bedell, sometimes assisted by a Yeoman Bedell. These are largely administrative positions, although performing the traditional duties of a bedell for graduation ceremonies.

In Canada, the position of Esquire Bedell is primarily a ceremonial role in graduation (often referred to as convocation) ceremonies for large universities such as McMaster University or the University of Guelph, and typically carries a ceremonial staff or mace. The position is usually held by a senior administrative officer such as the Registrar or Secretary.

In New Zealand, the University of Auckland has Esquires Bedell.

== See also ==
- Beadle
- Bedel
