= New Guinea Volunteer Rifles =

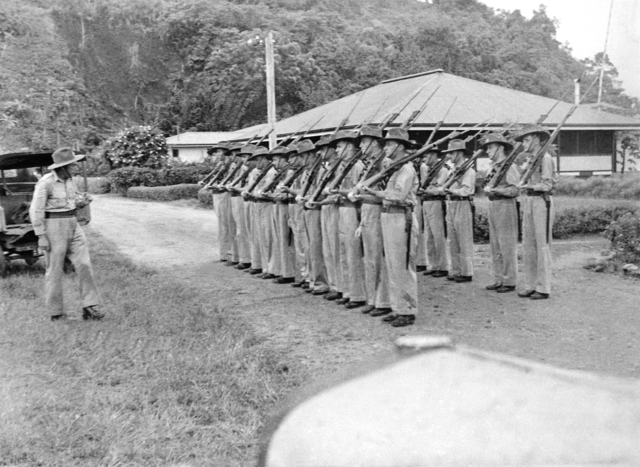
- The Salamaua platoon of the NGVR on parade in April 1940.
- Active: 1939–43; 1951–73
- Country: Australia
- Branch: Australian Army
- Type: Militia
- Role: Infantry
- Size: One battalion ~300–850 men
- Part of: 8th Military District (1939–43); Northern Command (1951–65); Papua New Guinea Command (1965–73)
- Garrison/HQ: Rabaul (1939–41); Lae (1941–43); Port Moresby (1951–68); Lae (1968–73)
- Mottos: Per Angusta Ad Augusta (Through Trial to Triumph)
- Colours: Cream over red, under green bar
- March: Imperial Echoes (Note: Authorised in 1951.)
- Engagements: Second World War: New Guinea campaign
- Battle honours: Rabaul, Wau, South West Pacific 1942–43

Insignia
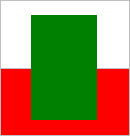
- Unit colour patch
- Regimental Flower: Flame of the Forest

The New Guinea Volunteer Rifles (NGVR) was an infantry battalion of the Australian Army. It was initially raised as a unit of the Militia from white Australian and European expatriates in New Guinea upon the outbreak of the Second World War in 1939, before being activated for full-time service following the Japanese landings in early 1942. NGVR personnel then helped rescue survivors of Lark Force from Rabaul in February and March 1942. Between March and May, the NGVR monitored the Japanese bases which had been established in the Huon Gulf region, being the only Allied force in the area until the arrival of Kanga Force at Wau in May. The battalion subsequently established observation posts overlooking the main approaches and reported on Japanese movements.

Later, it inflicted significant casualties on the Japanese in a series of raids, and led them to believe that they faced a much larger opposing force. On 29 June, the NGVR and the newly arrived 2/5th Independent Company carried out a highly successful attack on the Japanese garrison in Salamaua, killing at least 113 men. When the focus shifted to the Milne Bay and Kokoda Track battles of August and September, the NGVR continued to man its posts overlooking the Japanese base areas. The Japanese were subsequently defeated in the Battle of Wau in January and February 1943, relieving the pressure on the NGVR. The battalion was disbanded in April 1943 due to attrition.

In the years immediately following the war the Australian Army considered re-establishing a military presence in Papua New Guinea (PNG), although there was some opposition among white settlers to the raising of native units. As an interim measure, the re-establishment of the NGVR was approved in July 1949. The unit reformed as the Papua New Guinea Volunteer Rifles (PNGVR) on 16 March 1951, initially as a whites-only reserve unit of the Citizen Military Forces (CMF). In March 1951 a PNGVR detachment assisted in relief operations following the eruption of Mount Lamington, which killed 3,466 people and left more than 5,000 homeless. Between 1951 and 1953 PNGVR elements were established in all the main centres of Papua New Guinea.

Meanwhile, in addition to its other responsibilities the PNGVR fostered the raising of the regular Pacific Islands Regiment (PIR) and Headquarters Area Command Papua New Guinea. During the mid-1960s the enlistment of Papua New Guinean and Chinese personnel had finally been authorised, with the unit evolving into a multi-racial battalion. By 1969 only one-fifth of PNGVR members were Europeans. Yet amid concerns about the ability of the fledgling nation of PNG to finance a large military capability on its own, and with the need to maintain a CMF-type unit in the army of an independent PNG being questionable, the PNGVR was ultimately disbanded in 1973, shortly before independence, leaving the PIR as the only infantry unit in the new Papua New Guinea Defence Force.

== History ==
=== Second World War ===
==== Formation ====
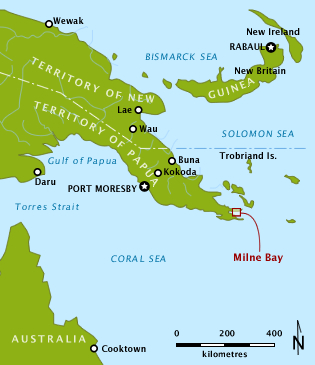
The territories of Papua and New Guinea

By 1939 the eastern half of the island of New Guinea was divided into the territories of Papua in the south, and the former German colony of New Guinea in the north, both of which were administered by Australia. Due to the provisions of the League of Nations mandate under which German New Guinea had been entrusted to Australia in 1920 following its capture during the First World War, little in the way of defensive preparations had been made in the mandated territory, even as global conflict became more likely. (Note: Granted under Article 22 of the Covenant of the League of Nations, the mandate imposed restrictions on the establishment of military and naval bases, fortifications, and the military training of local inhabitants for purposes other than the maintenance of law and order.) Following the outbreak of war in Europe the raising of a Militia battalion in New Guinea, known as the New Guinea Volunteer Rifles (NGVR), was authorised on 4 September 1939. Early arrangements for the raising of the unit were undertaken by Lieutenant Colonel John Walstab, with the unit's initial establishment limited to just 21 officers and 400 other ranks. As Superintendent of Police, Walstab's influence ensured a close link between the police and the NGVR, with the police stores organisation controlling the issue of arms and equipment and police guards manning the NGVR's store and parade ground.

The men were all white Australian or European expatriates and were drawn from a wide range of civilian occupations, although the majority were longtime residents and included gold miners, planters, traders and government officials. Most had lived in the territory for years, and many were quite old, with men between the ages of 18 and 50 accepted. Yet they were familiar with the terrain and the local inhabitants, even if they were poorly armed and equipped. Due to the paternalistic concerns of the civilian administration regarding native welfare and unease about providing the indigenous population with arms and military training they were not recruited into the NGVR, although they did serve in the Papuan Infantry Battalion (PIB) from June 1940. (Note: Such measures were not extended to the mandated territory of New Guinea until 1944 after which natives were recruited for service in the 1st, 2nd, 3rd and 4th New Guinea Infantry Battalions. Along with the PIB, these units were amalgamated to form the Pacific Islands Regiment in November 1944.) Enlistment was for a period of two years and was unpaid except for a one pound annual allowance, unless called up for active service. Uniforms consisted of khaki shirts and trousers made from material sent from Australia, while felt hats, bandoliers, leather belts, boots, puttees and brass NGVR shoulder badges were also worn. Weapons included First World War-era .303 rifles and some Vickers and Lewis machine-guns.

==== Initial preparations ====
On 21 December 1939, Major Ross Field, a former officer in the Australian Imperial Force (AIF) and Director of Public Works at Rabaul, took over command of the unit. A headquarters was subsequently established at Rabaul, while sub-units were located at Wau, Salamaua, Lae and Madang. In the event of war the NGVR would be dispersed at strategic points on the mainland and the islands of the territory. If mobilised, the NGVR would come under the operational command of the 8th Military District which was in the process of being raised under the command of Major General Basil Morris. One of the unit's first tasks was to provide an armed escort for enemy aliens, mostly Germans and Austrians, who were being deported to Australia by ship to be interned. Contingents departed on 29 September 1939, 9 November 1939 and 31 May 1940, with each escort party consisting of a non-commissioned officer and six private soldiers. Meanwhile, on 12 December the compulsory evacuation of all European women and children in Papua and New Guinea was ordered. In June 1940 the NGVR's establishment was increased to 23 officers and 482 other ranks, although this proved difficult to achieve due to the demands of recruitment for overseas service with the Second Australian Imperial Force, which resulted in a large turn-over of men. At this time contingency plans for the defence of Papua and New Guinea envisioned the deployment of Australian forces to Rabaul and Port Moresby, while the defence of Lae and Salamaua would be left to the NGVR.

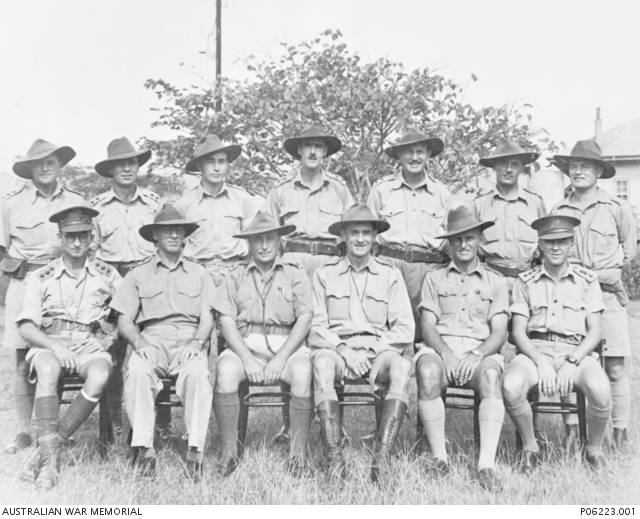
NGVR officers, 1940

The atmosphere in the battalion in the early days was one of enthusiasm, with many of the older members taking a leading role. In April and June two regular instructors from the Australian Instructional Corps were sent to Rabaul in order to improve the standard of training in the unit. By July 1940 it was spread thin, with an authorized strength of 226 men based at Rabaul, 151 at Wau, 85 at Bulolo, 39 at Salamaua and 19 at Madang, for a total establishment of 520. As the war with Germany and Italy continued in Europe, North Africa and the Middle East, Australian fears of Japanese intentions in Pacific grew. Yet with the bulk of Australian military and naval forces in the Middle East, defensive preparations remained limited. Two brigades from the 8th Division were subsequently dispatched to Singapore and then Malaya in February 1941, while a Militia battalion would be stationed between Port Moresby and Thursday Island, an AIF battalion would garrison Rabaul on New Britain, and the 8th Division's third brigade – less the battalion at Rabaul – would be dispersed piecemeal in Timor and Ambon. In July 1941 the 1st Independent Company was deployed to Kavieng on New Ireland in order to protect the airfield, while sections were sent to Namatanai in central New Ireland, Vila in the New Hebrides, Tulagi on Guadalcanal, Buka Passage in Bougainville, and Lorengau on Manus Island to act as observers. In early 1941 volcanic activity in the Rabaul area forced the government to move its administration to Lae, and NGVR's headquarters also moved at this time.

==== Rabaul ====
The 2/22nd Battalion subsequently began arriving in Rabaul in March and April 1941, while additional units added to the force. Designated Lark Force, it was directed to garrison the town. Tasks included protecting the airfields at Lakunai and Vunakanau and the seaplane base in Simpson Harbour, as well as forming "an advanced observation line" to provide early warning of Japanese movements. Following its arrival the role of the NGVR in Rabaul became a secondary one, and as a consequence the 80 men stationed there were not mobilised and the detachment was largely subsumed by the AIF battalion instead. Occupying defensive positions around Simpson Harbour the Australians were widely dispersed, with companies at Praed Point, Talili Bay, Lakunai airfield, and another inland at Vunakanau airfield, while other elements covered the coastal approaches, near Vulcan crater. Meanwhile, the NGVR spent the following months preparing defensive positions around Lakunai airfield. Lieutenant Colonel John Scanlan subsequently took over command of Lark Force in October.

Yet with the position increasingly viewed as untenable, the garrison was reinforced with four Lockheed Hudson bombers and ten obsolete CAC Wirraway reconnaissance aircraft from No. 24 Squadron RAAF, and by December had grown to 1,400 men. Despite Lark Force being considered too weak to repel the expected Japanese attack, no plans were made for its withdrawal and instead the Japanese were to be made to fight for the island. In September the administrator of the Mandated Territory, Sir Walter McNicoll, and his staff transferred to Lae. The Japanese began aerial reconnaissance over Rabaul soon after the attack on Pearl Harbor on 7 December, while the compulsory evacuation of all remaining European women and children to relative safety in Australia was ordered on 12 December. Meanwhile, scattered across the islands to the north, the 270 men of the 1st Independent Company were all that lay between Rabaul and the large Japanese base at Truk in the Caroline Islands.

On the mainland the NGVR formed independent detachments at Wau, Salamaua, Bulolo and Lae. By mid-1941 it had lost many of its youngest and most dedicated members, many of whom had left to join the AIF instead. Those that remained found the difficulties of making the journey from their remote home locations to the training centres increasingly onerous, while many were disappointed by the lack of ammunition and equipment for training. In September NGVR's headquarters was transferred to Bulolo on the mainland, while Field relinquished command and was replaced by Major (later Colonel) Bill Edwards. One of more enthusiastic of the early volunteers, Edwards revitalized the unit on the goldfields and many new recruits came in. By December, with war against Japan seemingly imminent the strength of the NGVR was 12 officers and 284 other ranks in total, with just 170 to 180 men on the mainland. On 8 December 1941, the day after war began in the Pacific, Morris was authorised to place the battalion on full-time duty, although only a small number were ultimately called up at this time.

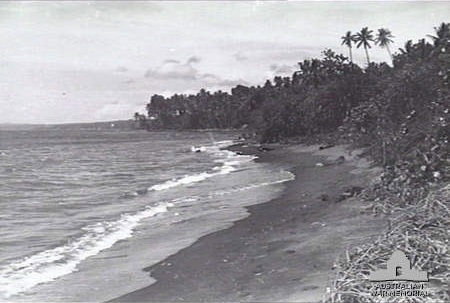
View of the Japanese landing beach in Rabaul

Meanwhile, Australian defences in Papua remained limited and were centred on Port Moresby, consisting of approximately 1,000 only partially trained Militia from the 49th Battalion, two six-inch coastal guns, a 3.7-inch anti-aircraft battery and a few Consolidated PBY Catalina flying boats, in addition to the locally recruited PIB which was still forming. However, with the Japanese soon expected to attempt to seize Rabaul and Port Moresby the remainder of the 30th Brigade was brought forward, with the 39th and 53rd Battalions arriving in Port Moresby on 3 January. Yet despite such measures, Australian unpreparedness and the speed of the coming Japanese advance meant that the NGVR was destined to provide the only armed resistance in New Guinea until the middle of 1942.

The first air attacks on Rabaul began on 4 January 1942. Within days the Japanese had succeeded in destroying the bulk of the defending aircraft, while further attacks targeted shipping in the harbour and shore installations. Scanlan considered he would need an entire brigade to defend Rabaul, yet with an invasion imminent all he could do was redeploy some of his limited force, while the remaining aircraft were withdrawn to Lae and the airfields cratered. The Japanese South Seas Force of approximately 5,300 men under the command of Major General Tomitarō Horii landed at Rabaul in the early hours of 23 January 1942. Attached to Lark Force, the NGVR detachment was positioned on the northern flank of the defensive line around Simpson Harbour with A Company, 2/22nd Battalion, manning medium machine-gun and mortar positions at Vulcan Island. Defending a 1,600-metre (1,700 yd) section of beach, one of the detachments subsequently engaged a Japanese force after dawn as they came ashore by barge, inflicting a number of casualties on them before being forced to withdraw.

Outnumbered, Lark Force was quickly overrun in the ensuing fighting, with the Japanese completing the capture of the town within 24 hours. Australian losses were heavy, with 28 men killed and most of the defenders captured. The survivors withdrew into the interior, moving south across New Britain to the Open Bay and Wide Bay areas, and west, for eventual evacuation. In total more than 400 servicemen and civilians escaped. Only 11 NGVR soldiers were among them. Many were less fortunate. 160 wounded and sick Australian soldiers, including a number of NGVR personnel, were captured and subsequently murdered by the Japanese at Tol Plantation in Wide Bay. Later, the Japanese naval prison ship Montevideo Maru was sunk off the west coast of Luzon in the South China Sea on 1 July 1942 after she was hit by three torpedoes fired by the submarine USS Sturgeon, resulting in the loss of 1,035 lives, most of them Australian civilians and prisoners of war from Rabaul. Among those killed were 36 men from the NGVR.

==== Salamaua–Lae–Wau ====
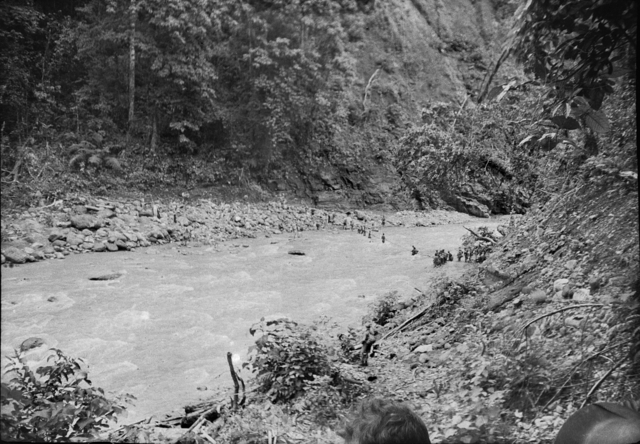
Australians retreating from Rabaul cross the Warangoi / Adler River in the Bainings Mountains, on the eastern side of the Gazelle Peninsula.

The battalion was finally mobilised on 21 January 1942. The same day 60 Japanese aircraft simultaneously attacked Lae, Salamaua and Bulolo. Realising the Japanese occupation of the north coast settlements of the Huon Gulf was imminent, McNicoll declared a state of emergency, handing over control to the NGVR second-in-command, Major Edmund Jenyns. With a Japanese landing at Lae expected and with the NGVR on full-time duty, all civilians departed on 24 January. Four days later McNicoll returned to Australia, effectively ending civil administration in New Guinea. Only six RAAF signallers and five or six soldiers from the NGVR remained to report Japanese movements. Meanwhile, other NGVR groups defended strategic points in the area, and from mid-February the NGVR detachment from Wau joined the Salamaua platoon, with the company concentrating at Mubo under Captain Douglas Umphelby.

Ill-equipped and wearing an assortment of clothing and uniforms, their webbing was mostly of First World War vintage leather. Lacking helmets and entrenching tools, they carried packs and haversacks weighing in excess of 40 to 50 pounds (18 to 23 kg). With an average age of 35 years, most of the men had lived New Guinea for a considerable period of time. Highly individualistic and with limited military training, they lacked the coherence of a formed unit, while many brought their native labour lines with them to share the burden. The men readied themselves to fight a guerrilla war from the hinterland against the expected invasion, as well as preparing to destroy key infrastructure to deny it to the Japanese. Meanwhile, another company formed at Lae under Captain Hugh Lyon for the same purpose. Both companies were ordered to commence a demolition campaign in the event of a Japanese landing, although Wau airfield was to be left intact for the time being. NGVR personnel also helped rescue 217 survivors of Lark Force from Rabaul in February and March 1942.

On 8 March 1942 approximately 3,000 Japanese naval troops landed unopposed at Lae forcing the NGVR detachment to withdraw west towards Nadzab, while another battalion from the South Sea's Force landed further south at Salamaua the same day. After observing the landings the NGVR detachment skirmished with the Japanese and attempted to demolish the airfield before withdrawing across the Francisco River, destroying the bridge across the river mouth as they went. The Japanese subsequently occupied Salamaua, and after leaving a section at the river the NGVR detachment moved south to Mubo. Although in the panic which followed Morris had initially ordered Edwards to prevent the Japanese from crossing the mountains, this failed to recognise the reality of the situation and subsequently proved unrealistic. Unable to be resupplied and lacking modern weapons and equipment, and with relatively few men and no prospect of reinforcement, the NVGR lacked the strength to block any Japanese movement inland. Although Morris was concerned about the possible loss of the Bulolo Valley, with Port Moresby threatened he was unable to reinforce the NGVR at Wau. Yet the Japanese chose to consolidate their position instead. Meanwhile, the NGVR was ordered to destroy the airfield at Wau and carry out a demolition campaign in the Bulolo Valley. Edwards rashly authorised the destruction of the two power stations in the valley and bridges at Bulolo and Wau, and despite there being no indication of a Japanese move towards Wau, the order was completed nonetheless. At Lae the primary concern of the Japanese was to get the airfield operational.

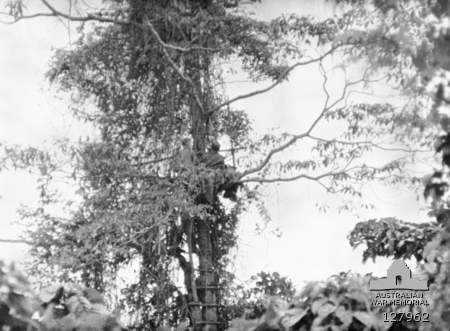
NGVR tree top observation post.

From its position at Mubo Umphelby's company was subsequently ordered to maintain observation over the town and to block any Japanese movement towards Wau. A number of supply dumps and observation posts had been prepositioned in the hinterland and these were utilised for the task, while two Vickers machine-guns were subsequently set up to cover the narrow approach up the Bitoi River valley to Mubo. The company included a number of men who possessed an intimate knowledge of the difficult terrain in the area, and despite limited equipment and supply deficiencies, they were subsequently able to provide invaluable intelligence to the Australian high command. Meanwhile, after the fall of Lae Lyon's company had been stationed in the Markham Valley to the west, and was tasked with observing Japanese movements from that direction.

Although the Japanese were slow to move inland, a party of 60 soldiers subsequently destroyed the NGVR stores dump at Komiatum on 18 March before returning to Salamaua. Around Lae the Japanese remained confined to the township over the following weeks, focusing on making the airfield operational and establishing workshops and supply dumps in the area. Between March and May, with a strength of just 500 men, the NGVR monitored the Japanese bases which had been established in the Huon Gulf region, being the only Allied force in the area until the arrival of Kanga Force at Wau in May 1942. The battalion then established observation posts and camps overlooking the main approaches and reported on Japanese movements and shipping, and called in airstrikes, while planning their own offensive. Later, it inflicted significant casualties on the Japanese in a series of raids, and led them to believe that they faced a much larger opposing force.

Following the bombing of Port Moresby in early February the civil administration in Papua had also been replaced by military control, with the Australian New Guinea Administrative Unit (ANGAU) formed to administer both Papua and New Guinea in a unified military government, following their hurried amalgamation. Regardless, the NGVR remained the only Allied unit operating on the north coast and goldfields over this period. It subsequently assisted the evacuation of many European civilians from the war-zone, with many being flown out, while others moved by ship or overland to Port Moresby. As the sole representative of government authority, the NGVR also assumed responsibility for several thousand indentured native labourers recruited from the outlying districts who had been left without support and were unable to return to their homes. The NGVR subsequently established camps and fed them, and they became the first of many carriers and labourers enlisted to support the Allies during the fighting that followed. Meanwhile, the Japanese took Finschhafen on 10 March and occupied Bougainville later that month. Yet Morris was now finally in a position to begin reinforcing the NGVR. A platoon of reinforcements intended for the 2/1st Independent Company subsequently reached Port Moresby in late March following the loss of New Britain and New Ireland and they were sent over the Bulldog Track to support the NGVR instead.

Edwards next sent an NGVR scout section to find out what the Japanese were doing in Salamaua in late March. Although they were subsequently detected the Japanese failed to find them; however, with the local inhabitants facing reprisals for assisting the Australians, the NGVR withdrew to avoid further consequences for them. Similar posts were subsequently established along the Markham Valley and at Heath's Plantation, closer to Lae to observe Japanese movements. Elsewhere, Lorengau on Manus Island was subsequently captured by the Japanese on 8 April. Meanwhile, minor skirmishing occurred in April and May in the Markham Valley as the Japanese attempted to challenge the NGVR presence in the area. The NGVR continued its role of observing the Japanese, with Port Moresby instructing that no operations were to be undertaken against Lae or Salamua without orders, and that reinforcements were soon to be sent to the area. On 23 April a Japanese fighting patrol of approximately 65 men from Salamaua moved on Komiatum, challenging NGVR control of the area. The Japanese subsequently discovered the NGVR stores there and ejected a small group of Australians guarding the village. Although the fighting continued for most of the day and resulted in three Japanese killed and several others wounded, the village was subsequently destroyed along with the NGVR stores. The NGVR detachment was then forced to withdraw to Mubo, while the Japanese returned to Salamaua. Following the capture of Madang on 1 May by the Japanese, the inland towns of Wau and Bulolo in the Morobe District were the only major centres in New Guinea still in Allied hands.

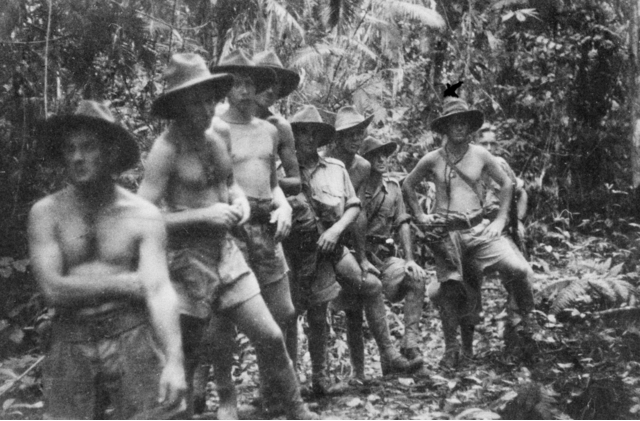
A section of 'C' Platoon, 2/5th Independent Company, marching along a jungle track, west of Bulwa in the Bulolo Valley

The Battle of the Coral Sea between 4 and 8 May effectively removed the threat of a Japanese invasion of Port Moresby. Meanwhile, a force consisting of the 2/5th Independent Company under Major Paul Kneen and supporting units had been tasked with undertaking a limited guerrilla offensive to harass and destroy Japanese personnel and equipment in the Lae and Salamaua area and the Markham Valley. Designated Kanga Force under the command of Major Norman Fleay, the first elements flew into Wau from Port Moresby on 23 May to reinforce the NGVR. Kanga force consisted of two companies of the NGVR split between the Markham Valley and Mubo, a platoon from the 2/1st Independent Company, and the 2/5th Independent Company with the force subsequently in position nine days later. Kanga force's main problem was one of logistics. Supplies for Kanga Force were either flown in, depending on aircraft availability, or shipped to the mouth of the Lakekamu River in small craft, transported up the river to Bulldog in canoes and then carried over the Bulldog Track by native porters.

By early June, Kanga Force was largely concentrated at Wau, although there were elements of the 2/1st and 2/5th spread out as far as Bulwa, and elements of the NGVR at Mapos. The NGVR was still watching the Salamaua sector from Mubo, whilst other elements were covering the inland routes from the Markham and Wampit Rivers. As Fleay attempted to juggle his forces and relieve the exhausted NGVR detachments, his orders were clarified and work began on planning a number of raids in the area. Fleay considered there were 2,000 Japanese in Lae and 250 in Salamaua. In comparison, he had just 700 men, of whom only 450 were fit for operations, with the force too small to meet the many possible Japanese threats. The threat of an overland advance required him to defend the numerous tracks through the Bulolo Valley, while the threat of an air invasion required him to defend likely landing zones at Wau, Bulolo, Bulwa and Otibanda, meaning that Fleay had even less resources to achieve his mission. He assessed that the only course of action available was to maintain a large force in the Bulolo Valley to defend the overland route to Papua, while conducting a number of raids in the area in order to inflict casualties on the Japanese and forestall any advance. These would be concentrated in three areas: on the Japanese force at Heath's Plantation, where they formed an obstacle to any large-scale movement against Lae; on the Lae area to destroy the aircraft, dumps and installations located there, and to test the defences with a view to larger scale operations in the future; and on the Salamaua area to destroy the wireless station, aerodrome and dumps.

Initial raids would subsequently be undertaken at Salamaua and Heath's Plantation, led by Major Paul Kneen and Captain Norman Winning from the 2/5th Independent Company. Targeting the aerodrome and 300-strong Japanese garrison Winning planned the assault on Salamaua with Umphelby from the NGVR, following careful reconnaissance by NGVR scouts under Sergeant Jim McAdam. Early in the morning of 29 June 1942, 71 members of the NGVR and the 2/5th Independent Company carried out a highly successful attack, killing at least 113 men and destroying a number of installations including the radio station and supply dumps for the loss of only three men slightly wounded. In addition, the Australians captured a small amount of enemy equipment and a number of documents, including marked maps, sketches, and Japanese orders. The simultaneous raid on Heath's Plantation at Lae was carried out by 58 men, mainly from the 2/5th Independent Company. Although also successful, surprise was lost after watchdogs warned the Japanese of their approach, and Kneen was subsequently killed and two men were wounded, while Japanese losses included 42 killed. Following the raids, the Japanese sent patrols of up to 90 men into the foothills in the hinterland around Salamaua, destroying the camp at Butu and reinforcements were moved from the garrison at Lae to Kela village. Meanwhile, reconnaissance reports indicated that the Japanese had been forced to draw on their garrison at Lae to reinforce their perimeter at Salamaua during early July in an attempt to prevent further raids.

In retaliation Japanese aircraft subsequently bombed Wau, Bulolo and Skindiwai on 2 July, killing a number of Australians, destroying some houses and buildings, and driving many native carriers into the bush. Meanwhile, the Japanese garrison at Salamaua continued to be reinforced, with NGVR scouts estimating that another 200 soldiers had arrived since the raid, with the force there growing to between 400 and 500 men. Strong patrols were subsequently observed searching the tracks around the town for the Australians. Although the morale of the NGVR remained high, the effect of continuous operations in the harsh terrain with only limited logistic and medical support took their toll, with many falling ill to fever and tropical disease. The number of fit men decreased steadily. On 5 July Fleay restricted Kanga force activities to patrolling and observation. Finally the Japanese moved on Mubo, defended by just 64 men from the NGVR and 2/5th Independent Company occupying the high ground overlooking the village and the airstrip, with a lightly equipped force of 136 Japanese marines from the Sasebo 5th Special Naval Landing Party crossing the Francisco River on the morning 21 July. Approaching Mubo around 17:00 the Japanese clashed with the Australians and were scattered. With the Japanese trapped in the river valley, the Australians opened fire with four Vickers machine-guns, three Lewis guns and three Brens, inflicting between 50 and 60 casualties, including 12 killed, without loss. The Japanese were subsequently forced to withdraw towards Salamaua, carrying their dead and wounded. The same day the Japanese launched a simultaneous thrust up the Markham Valley against the 2/5th Independent Company.

With a seaborne movement blocked, the Japanese again attempted to move against Port Moresby overland in July. Following a landing near Gona, on the north coast of New Guinea, on the night of 21/22 July, Japanese forces attempted to advance south overland through the mountains of the Owen Stanley Range to seize Port Moresby as part of a strategy of isolating Australia from the United States, resulting in a series of battles during the Kokoda Track campaign. From that point the importance of Kanga Force's operations around Salamaua and Wau declined, with the direct threat posed by the landings dictating that the limited forces and supplies available to the Australians be concentrated on Port Moresby. Lieutenant General Sydney Rowell took over command of New Guinea Force from Morris on 12 August at the height of the fighting. The 2/6th Independent Company had arrived in Port Moresby on 7 August and it had been planned to send them forward to Wau to reinforce Kanga Force. However, with the Japanese threat against Port Moresby growing increasingly serious they were held in reserve there instead, while Kanga Force would be required to continue to hold on with the limited resources available to them. Meanwhile, as food was not getting through to Kanga Force, the soldiers of the NGVR became increasingly dependent on local supplies. Japanese air raids against their supply dumps, intimidation of the local inhabitants, large scale desertions of native carriers, and the inherent difficulty of getting supplies forward to feed those carriers that remained combined to threaten to stop their operations altogether.

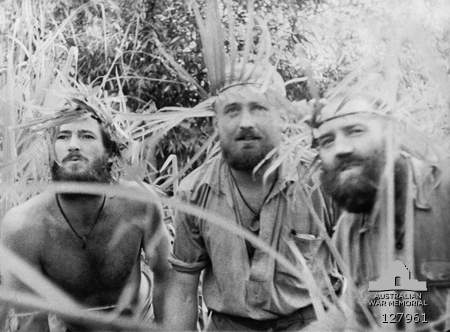
NGVR soldiers manning an observation position, August 1942

The Japanese subsequently staged a landing at Milne Bay on the eastern tip of New Guinea on the evening of 25 August 1942 to reduce the Allied airfields that had been established there, further straining the limited resources available to Rowell and preventing him from reinforcing Kanga Force. Yet despite some success the landing force was subsequently destroyed by the Australians with the survivors forced to evacuate by sea on 4–5 September. During this time Horii's South Seas Detachment had continued to make strong progress along the Kokoda Track, although the outnumbered Australian opposition was becoming increasingly effective. By 16 September the Japanese had reached Ioribaiwa, in sight of Port Moresby itself. However, following a heavy defeat at Guadalcanal, Horrii was ordered onto the defensive. The Japanese subsequently began to withdraw from Kokoda on 24 September to establish a defensive position on the north coast, but were closely followed by the Australians who recaptured Kokoda on 2 November. Further fighting continued into November and December as Australian and United States forces assaulted the Japanese beachheads, in what later became known as the Battle of Buna–Gona. Gona was captured on 9 December 1942 and Buna on 3 January 1943. The Japanese subsequently began to abandon Sanananda on 13 January following an unsuccessful Australian assault the day before. Mopping up operations were completed on 22 January.

Meanwhile, the privations of operating around Mubo and in the Markham Valley continued to take their toll on the Australians, and by early August the bulk of the men forward of Bulolu and Wau were commandos. The NGVR had been exhausted by their exertions during the fighting and few now remained, with a small group from the 2/5th Independent Company relieving the NGVR scouts for their observation role. Indeed, by September 1942 the NGVR was no longer recognisable as a unit. (Note: Although early that same month the battalion's unit colour patch, consisting of cream over red, under a green bar, was approved under General Routine Order 370 of 4 September 1942.) As the first phase of irregular warfare in the Salamaua–Lae–Wau region came to a close by the end of August, the Japanese occupied Mubo from where they were positioned to seize Wau and the Bulolo Valley, but had not yet moved up the Markham Valley in strength. The Australians were subsequently forced to abandon Wau and the Bulolo Valley, and were preparing to hold a position at the head of the Bulldog Track. While the focus of the campaign in New Guinea shifted to the Milne Bay and Kokoda Track battles in August and September 1942 the NGVR continued to man its posts overlooking the Japanese base areas, patrolling extensively. The Allies remained concerned about the defence of the important air installation at Wau and were keen to secure the crest of the Owen Stanleys in that area. Consequently, the 2/7th Independent Company was flown into Wau in October 1942 to reinforce Wau. Anticipating an attack by the Japanese, General Thomas Blamey ordered the 17th Brigade from Milne Bay to reinforce Wau and relieve Kanga Force, and on 16 January 1943 the Japanese launched an offensive against Wau, known as the Battle of Wau.

==== Disbandment ====
The Japanese were subsequently defeated at Wau in January and February 1943, relieving the pressure on the NGVR. Following this, as problems with supply and sickness reduced Fleay's effectiveness, Kanga Force was broken up on 23 April 1943 with its individual units becoming part of the 3rd Division, which left Wau to begin the Salamaua-Lae campaign to drive the Japanese from Salamaua. Meanwhile, ANGAU had expanded its activities on the goldfields, restoring military administration and the organisation of the supply and supervision of native carriers supporting Allied forces. By this time NGVR was believed to contain 300 men; however, most were suffering ill health following months of guerrilla fighting, and many were experiencing ill affects due to their age. Having suffered heavy attrition, and with no further reinforcements available in New Guinea, the unit was finally disbanded in April 1943. (Note: According to Festberg the official date of disbandment is given as 6 October 1942. However, individuals had continued to serve in Kanga Force and other units after this time.) As a part-time volunteer unit, the NGVR was unique in the history of PNG, yet due to their military training, their knowledge of New Guinea and its people, and their experiences in the early days of the war, many of its surviving members became part of ANGAU, while others remained as coastwatchers or in other capacities attached to AIF divisions and Z and M Special Units, continuing to serve until the end of hostilities in 1945. As the Allies moved onto the offensive in New Guinea they planned to neutralise and bypass the Japanese base at Rabaul as part of their advance. During the Admiralty Islands campaign a small number of Australians from ANGAU, including some ex-members of NGVR, were assigned to the US-led Brewer Force during a reconnaissance-in-force on the Japanese-held island of Los Negros between 29 February and 4 March 1944. (Note: For their actions the units of Brewer Force were later awarded a Distinguished Unit Citation by the United States. According to Downs this included the NGVR, thereby making it the only Australian militia battalion to receive the award. However, Harvey-Hall notes that the NGVR was not involved in the action on Los Negros Island in 1944, as it had been disbanded the previous year. Instead some former members of the NGVR were part of the ANGAU detachment that had accompanied Brewer Force, and that the citation had been handed over to B Company, PNGVR for safekeeping in 1952 on behalf of the Australian units that had been involved.)

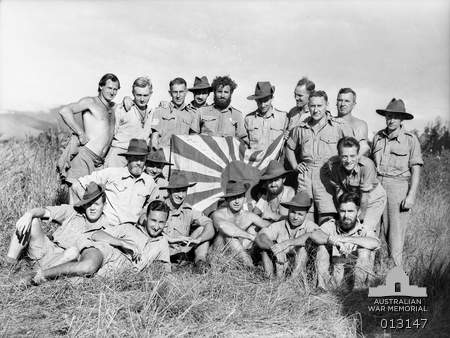
Members of B Company, NGVR with a captured Japanese flag.

Due to the nature of the early campaign in New Guinea the NGVR never fought as a formed unit, with it sub-units scattered and forced to fight independently instead. Its men had come from many walks of life, and while some were too old to join the AIF, or were medically unfit or employed in restricted occupations, they acquitted themselves well in the harsh terrain, with only limited equipment and support, often developing their own tactics. The battalion played an important role in the period to late May 1942 by maintaining contact with the Japanese, as well as demonstrating to the native population in the Salamaua–Wau–Lae region that the Australians had not been forced out of the area. They provided early warning of Japanese troop and aircraft movements, and succeeded in preventing the Japanese from utilising the Bulldog Track as an avenue of approach to Port Moresby. The NGVR also aided the deployment of Kanga Force and later supported US forces on Manus. As part of Kanga Force they also denied the Japanese the vital airfields at Wau and Bulolo, which would have brought Port Moresby within the effective range of Japanese bombers. They also initiated the organisation of New Guinean labour which was to provide a vital contribution to the success of the Allied campaign in New Guinea. While records are incomplete, approximately 600 to 850 men are believed to have served with the unit. A roll of honour in the Shrine of Memories in ANZAC Square, Brisbane lists the names of 95 men who were killed or died serving with the unit during the war.

=== Post war ===
==== Re-establishment ====
In the years immediately following the war the Australian Army considered re-establishing a military presence in PNG, although there was some opposition among the colonial administration and white settlers to the raising of native units, echoing previous concerns. As an interim measure, the re-establishment of the NGVR was approved in July 1949, re-forming as a whites-only reserve unit of the Citizen Military Forces (CMF). Volunteers were first called for in September 1950, with initial arrangements for the new unit begun by Lieutenant Colonel N.R. McLeod. Later, two non-commissioned officers arrived from Northern Command in October 1950, forming part of a small regular cadre which would support the administration of the unit and assist with its training. In February 1951 a small group of Australian officers and non-commissioned officers arrived to assist with raising the unit, and the re-raising of the Pacific Islands Regiment (PIR). The unit was subsequently raised as the Papua New Guinea Volunteer Rifles (PNGVR) on 16 March 1951, with the enlistment of the first recruits beginning in Port Moresby soon after. (Note: The re-raising of the unit was authorised on 16 March 1951. According to Sinclair recruiting began on 17 March 1951 and the first training parade took place on 18 March 1951.)

The PNGVR was intended to maintain sub-units capable of providing advice on topography, native customs and personalities, provision of guides and interpreters, and assistance in the organisation and training of irregular native forces. The unit would also form the basis for the future expansion of forces in PNG if required, and be of limited assistance to civic action projects. It would also provide detachments to protect vulnerable points and counter small-scale raids, and be capable of being used in border-type or counter-insurgency operations in support of regular forces following further training. The initial recruits were Australians, most of whom had served as officers or non-commissioned officers during the war. The first resident commanding officer was Lieutenant Colonel N.P. Maddern. Conditions of service were the same as for CMF units in Australia, while PNGVR members were paid the same as their Australian Regular Army (ARA) counterparts. Recruits were required to complete 12 days home training and a camp of 14 days each year, but could also undertake additional training periods if they wished.

==== Peace-time service ====
In March 1951 a small PNGVR detachment assisted in relief operations following the eruption of Mount Lamington which killed 3,466 people and left more than 5,000 homeless. By the end of 1951 detachments had been raised at Port Moresby, Lae, Wau and Rabaul. Initially the battalion included a headquarters company and two under strength rifle companies, with A Company based in Lae and B Company in Rabaul. Meanwhile, the raising of a locally recruited regular battalion manned by indigenous personnel and trained and commanded by Australian officers and non-commissioned officers had been authorised in November 1950, and in March 1951 the PIR was reformed with an initial strength of one battalion. In addition to its other responsibilities the PNGVR fostered the raising of the PIR and HQ Area Command Papua New Guinea. The PNGVR would augment the PIR in wartime, and the two units would later regularly train together. However, due to the terms of the UN trusteeship under which the territory had been entrusted to Australia it was decided from the outset that neither unit would serve outside PNG.

Yet the PNGVR did not live up to initial expectations, and it remained significantly under strength. By May 1952 it numbered just eight officers and 140 other ranks, yet Rowell, by then the Chief of the General Staff, decided against disbanding the battalion "... when there is the nucleus of a unit there". In assessing the unit's achievements, while only 0.24 per cent of the population of Brisbane belonged to the CMF at the time, the PNGVR had succeeded in recruiting 2.14 percent of the white population of the territories. The problem of raising a CMF unit in PNG was largely one of scale due to the small number of eligible men to recruit from, the absence of National Service intakes to swell its numbers, and the lack of suitable accommodation and training facilities. The role initially envisioned for the PNGVR proved overly ambitious, and it was subsequently redefined to being one of the provision of officers and non-commissioned officers for an expanded PIR during wartime.

Between 1951 and 1953 PNGVR elements were established in all the main centres in PNG. A platoon was subsequently formed at Samarai in December 1953, while further detachments were later established at Madang, Wewak, Goroka, Mount Hagen, Banz, Kainantu and Kavieng. A third rifle company was later raised, with C Company being formed at Goroka in 1957. In May 1958, for the first time since the Second World War soldiers of the unit participated in joint exercises with the PIR in the Goldie River–Kokoda Track area. Such exercises subsequently became a regular activity between the two units, while PNGVR detachments regularly marched with the PIR on Anzac Day and Queen's Birthday celebrations. As part of the annual training program soldiers of the unit undertook two weeks in concentrated exercises and training every year, initially at Goldie River. Meanwhile, the arms and equipment issued to the unit progressively improved. Unlike the rest of the CMF, the PNGVR was not reorganised along pentropic lines in 1960 and remained relatively unchanged.

The unit expanded in the early 1960s with additional resources becoming available and increased recruitment, and by 1962 Administration Company and D Company had been added to the establishment, both of which were based in Port Moresby. Yet the small European population and the rapid turnover of staff in local industries continued to limit the manpower available, while the Army preferred to recruit permanent residents such as planters and traders, who represented an even smaller minority. In order to increase the number of personnel available arrangements were made to allow CMF members who started their training in Australia and then transferred their civilian employment to PNG to continue to serve with the PNGVR, while those who completed their time in PNG were similarly able to complete their training upon their return to Australia.

In 1962 the battle honours won by the NGVR during Second World War were awarded to the PNGVR so that the history of the former unit could be perpetuated. (Note: These battle honours were approved in 1961, but awarded the following year.) As the fighting in West New Guinea between Indonesia and the Dutch reached its height, concerns about the security of the border grew. By January 1963 the unit had grown to 550 men, all of them white. However, in 1964 the enlistment of Papua New Guinean and Chinese personnel had finally been authorised, with the unit evolving into a multi-racial battalion. A large number of Papua New Guineans subsequently applied to join the unit. The strength of the unit increased rapidly as a result, and an additional platoon was subsequently raised at Kainantu the same year. A camp was subsequently built at Ambra, near Mount Hagen, and the first integrated camp was held there in November 1964. Yet the cost of flying men to Ambra proved prohibitive and from 1966 annual camps were held at Lae, initially at a wartime facility on the Bumbu River, and later at Igam Barracks. Papua New Guinea Command was formed in 1965, ending the link with Headquarters Northern Command in Brisbane. During this time CMF officers from Australia began visiting PNG to gain experience in operating in tropical conditions with the PNGVR and PIR, with the first group arriving in October 1965.

The Cold War and growing Australian concern about Indonesian intentions during the Indonesia–Malaysia confrontation saw increasing defence resources allocated to PNG during the 1960s, including the raising of a second PIR battalion in 1965. As part of this process in March 1966 it was announced that the PNGVR would be reorganised as a full battalion on the Tropical Warfare Establishment, with its strength expanded to 750 men of all ranks, while it would also receive a range of new weapons and equipment, including new heavy barrelled 7.62 mm L1A1 Self-Loading Rifles, M60 machine-guns and 81 mm mortars. Support Company was subsequently raised in Port Moresby to replace the infantry company there, and included a mortar platoon, anti-tank platoon, signals platoon and an assault pioneer platoon. Meanwhile, the Wewak detachment was redesignated D Company, and took over control of the Madang platoon. In 1968 the construction of the new Ingam Barracks was completed at Lae, and Headquarters PNGVR was subsequently moved there from Murray Barracks in Port Moresby. By 1969 only one-fifth of PNGVR members were Europeans. On 17 May 1969, PNGVR was presented with the Queen's and Regimental Colours at Igam Barracks in Lae by the Administrator, Sir David Osborne Hay. A platoon was later raised at the University of Papua New Guinea (UPNG) in April 1970. In July 1971 Second Lieutenant Pascal Idok of the UPNG detachment subsequently became the first Papua New Guinean to be commissioned into the PNGVR.

==== Disbandment ====
Yet as relations with Indonesia improved and the Vietnam War came to an end, the changing strategic circumstances in the Asia-Pacific saw the unit establishment reduced to 440 all ranks during the early 1970s, while in the lead up to Papua New Guinean independence in 1975 consideration was given to disbanding the unit. Although unknown to the unit at the time, the PNGVR held its last annual training camp in August 1973 at Finschhafen, with 350 soldiers from detachments across the country participating. Amid concerns about the ability of the economy of the fledgling nation of Papua New Guinea to finance a large military capability on its own, and with the need to maintain a CMF-type unit in the army of an independent PNG being questionable, the PNGVR was ultimately disbanded on 1 December 1973, leaving the PIR as the only infantry unit in the new Papua New Guinea Defence Force. Although the decision to disband the unit was much debated within the Army at the time—and strongly resisted by the PNGVR Association—it had been felt that training a volunteer force without the considerable assistance of the ARA that had previously been available would be impossible after independence, while the possible destabilising effect a locally recruited unit might have was also a concern as the regional bases of the PNGVR might have provided a source of power in areas disaffected by the central government in Port Moresby. The PNGVR Queen's and Regimental Colours were subsequently laid up at the Australian War Memorial on Anzac Day 1974.

== Battle honours ==
The NGVR was awarded the following battle honours:

- Second World War: Rabaul, Wau, South West Pacific 1942–43.

== Commanding officers ==
The following officers commanded the NGVR:

- Second World War
  - Lieutenant Colonel C.R. Field (1939–41)
  - Lieutenant Colonel W.M. Edwards (1941–43)
- Post War
  - Lieutenant Colonel N.R. McLeod (1950)
  - Lieutenant Colonel N. P. Maddern (1951–53)
  - Lieutenant Colonel T.W. Young (1953–55)
  - Lieutenant Colonel J.K. Lynch (1955–57)
  - Lieutenant Colonel W.H. Wansley (1957)
  - Major D.H.C. Lloyd (1957)
  - Lieutenant Colonel J.K. Murdoch (1958–60)
  - Lieutenant Colonel R.T. Eldridge (1960–62)
  - Lieutenant Colonel R.D. Newman (1962–65)
  - Lieutenant Colonel M.A. Bishop (1965–68)
  - Lieutenant Colonel K.E. Gallard (1968–71)
  - Lieutenant Colonel W.A. Harrington (1971–72)
  - Lieutenant Colonel P. Cole (1972–73)

== Notes ==
Footnotes

Citations
