= Latukefu =

Latukefu is a Tongan surname. Notable people with this surname include:

- Pouvalu Latukefu (born 1971), Tongan rugby union player
- Sione Latukefu, Tongan historian
- Hau Latukefu (born 1976) Australian hip hop musician and radio host
- Uli Latukefu (born 1983), Australian actor and singer
