= 2/22nd Battalion (Australia) =

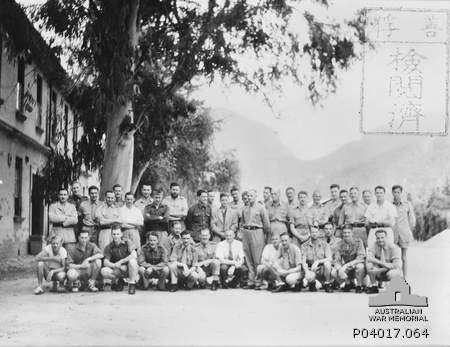
- Australian prisoners of war, including members of the 2/22nd Battalion, in Japan c. 1942–45.
- Active: 1940–1942
- Country: Australia
- Branch: Australian Army
- Type: Infantry
- Size: ~900 men (Note: At the start of World War II, the authorised strength of an Australian infantry battalion was 910 men all ranks.)
- Part of: 23rd Brigade, 8th Division
- Engagements: World War II: Battle of Rabaul (1942)

Insignia
- Unit colour patch

The 2/22nd Battalion was an infantry battalion of the Australian Army. Raised as part of the Second Australian Imperial Force for service during World War II, the battalion formed part of the 23rd Brigade, attached to the 8th Division. It was captured by the Japanese during the Battle of Rabaul in 1942. After being captured, the battalion was not re-raised and a large number of its personnel died in captivity; those that did not were returned to Australia at the end of the war in 1945.

== History ==
=== Formation and training ===
Formed on 1 July 1940 at Victoria Barracks, Melbourne, the 2/22nd Battalion formed part of the 23rd Brigade, attached to the 8th Division. The battalion's personnel were drawn from the state of Victoria, and included a number of veterans of the World War I. The colours chosen for the battalion's unit colour patch (UCP) were the same as those of the 22nd Battalion, a unit which had served during World War I before being raised as a Militia formation in 1921. These colours were purple over red, in a diamond shape, although a border of gray in an oval shape was added to the UCP to distinguish the battalion from its Militia counterpart; the oval border denoted that the battalion was an 8th Division unit.

With an authorised strength of around 900 personnel, like other Australian infantry battalions of the time, the battalion was formed around a nucleus of four rifle companies – designated 'A' through to 'D' – each consisting of three platoons. Shortly after being raised it moved to Trawool, Victoria, to undertake infantry training on 11 July. In September, the battalion was then required to march 235 kilometres (146 mi) to Bonegilla, arriving on 4 October. There they undertook further training before being sent to Sydney in April 1941 to begin the move to New Britain, where they were to form part of a garrison force being established in response to concerns about war with Japan in the Pacific. Upon formation, the 2/22nd's commanding officer was Lieutenant Colonel Howard Carr; he would remain in command of the battalion throughout its brief existence.

=== Rabaul ===
Embarking upon the troopship Zealandia, on 18 April 1941, on 26 April 1941, the 2/22nd arrived at Rabaul, New Britain, where they formed the main element of Lark Force, along with a few artillery units, a field ambulance, a detachment from the New Guinea Volunteer Rifles and No. 24 Squadron RAAF. They were tasked with protecting the seaplane base at Rabaul, the Lakunai and Vunakanau aerodromes and to delay any proposed Japanese advance towards Australia. The battalion formed an extra company, 'Y', from elements of the HQ company. Between April 1941 and January 1942, the battalion helped construct defences and acclimatised to the tropical environment. The Imperial Japanese started bombing Rabaul in early January 1942, in advance of an invasion. By 22 January, No. 24 Squadron had only three aircraft remaining and was forced to withdraw back to New Guinea, so the decision was made to crater both aerodromes in order to prevent the Japanese from landing aircraft.

In anticipation of the coming invasion, the battalion withdrew from around Rabaul and set up defences on the western shores of Blanche Bay, only hours before the Japanese landings commenced at 01:00 on 23 January. A series of desperate actions followed near the beaches around Simpson Harbour, Keravia Bay and Raluana Point as the Australians attempted to turn back the attack. As they were pushed back by overwhelming Japanese forces, the commander of Lark Force, Colonel John Scanlan, issued an order to withdraw. Elements of the 2/22nd that had not been captured escaped along New Britain's north and south coasts, moving in groups of varying sizes up to company-strength, with about 300 men from the battalion managing to escape to Australia via New Guinea. A small number of these men were sent to Salamaua where they took part in a brief defence following the Japanese landing at Salamaua in March 1942. The battalion was not re-raised at this time and those personnel that made it back to Australia were absorbed into the amalgamated 3rd/22nd Battalion, which was formed from the 2/22nd survivors along with volunteers for overseas service from the 3rd Battalion, which was ordered to disband following its return from New Guinea. Later, this battalion was also disbanded and its personnel transferred to the 2/3rd Battalion.

Some of the battalion who surrendered or were captured by the Japanese on New Britain were massacred at Tol Plantation, where around 160 Australians were killed. Their bodies would later be discovered by gunners from the 2/14th Field Regiment during the Australian campaign to secure the island in 1945. Those that were not killed at Tol were interned as prisoners of war. In June 1942 they were embarked upon the Montevideo Maru for transport to Hainan Island. While at sea, however, on 1 July, the ship was sunk by the submarine USS Sturgeon off the Philippines, with 1,053 prisoners and civilian internees losing their lives. Those members of the 2/22nd that had remained at Rabaul were later transported aboard the Natuno Maru to Japan where they remained in captivity until they were released in September 1945, following the end of hostilities.

The battalion lost 608 men who died or were killed in captivity and one man wounded. Members of the 2/22nd received the following decorations: one Military Cross, one Military Medal and 16 Mentioned in Despatches.

== Battle honours ==
The 2/22nd received only one battle honour during the war, that of "Rabaul 1942".

== Commanding officers ==
The following officers commanded the 2/22nd Battalion during the war:

- Lieutenant Colonel Howard Carr (1940–1942).

== Notes ==
Footnotes

Citations
