= Rodger Page =

Australian missionary (1878–1965)

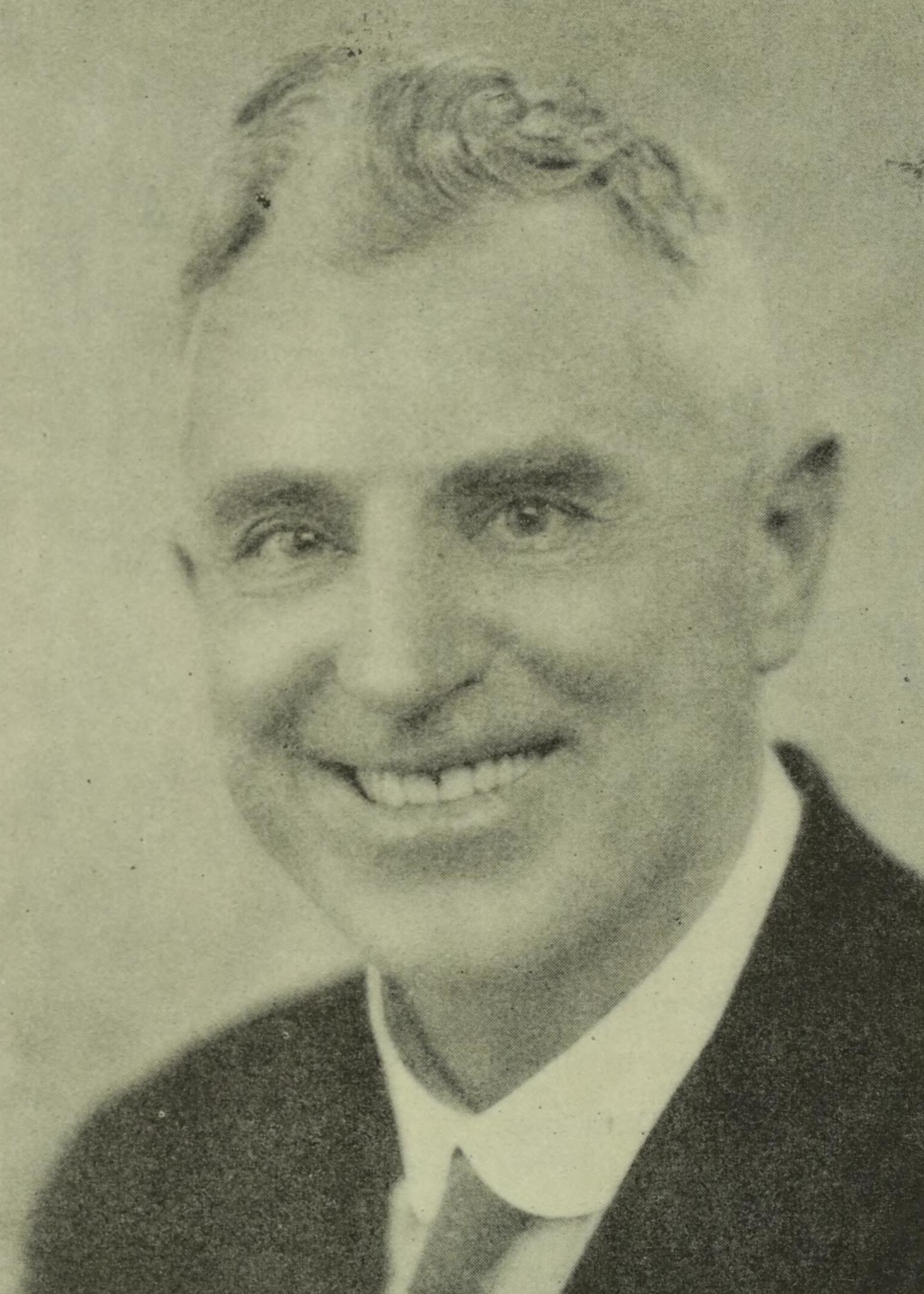
- Born: 17 October 1878; Grafton, New South Wales, Australia
- Died: 2 July 1965 (aged 86); Sydney, Australia
- Resting place: Malaʻe ʻAloa, Nukuʻalofa, Tonga
- Education: Wesleyan Theological Institution
- Spouse: Hannah Morrison (m. 1912; died 1939)
- Relatives: Earle Page (brother); Harold Page (brother); Robert Page (nephew)

Rodger Clarence George Page (17 October 1878 – 2 July 1965) was an Australian missionary and religious leader in Tonga. He was royal chaplain and advisor to Queen Sālote for over 20 years and a long-serving president of the Free Wesleyan Church of Tonga, the de facto state church.

Page was born in Grafton, New South Wales. He trained for the Methodist ministry in Sydney and was posted to Tonga in 1908. He played a key role in the 1924 reunification of the Methodist churches in Tonga and served as president of the Free Wesleyan Church from 1925 to 1946. As royal chaplain to Sālote, Page was an influential advisor on both personal and political matters and was viewed by some as a power behind the throne. He retired to Sydney but continued to visit Tonga regularly, with his ashes being returned to Tonga after his death for interment in a royal burial ground.

== Early life ==
Page was born on 17 October 1878 in Grafton, New South Wales, the fourth of eleven children born to Mary (née Cox) and Charles Page. His younger brothers included Australian prime minister Earle Page and New Guinea public servant Harold Page.

Page was raised on his father's property on Chatsworth Island in the Clarence River. His parents were devout Methodists and a number of family members held church offices. Page was educated at Grafton Public School and worked as his father's bookkeeper before moving to Sydney to train for the Methodist ministry at the Wesleyan Theological Institution. He was posted to Murrurundi and Quirindi before volunteering for overseas service as a missionary in 1908. According to Grafton's Daily Examiner, he was the first member of the Grafton Methodist Church to become a clergyman.

== Tonga ==
=== Early years ===
In 1908, Page was appointed chairman of the Wesleyan Mission in Tonga, a district of the Methodist Church of Australasia. The Wesleyan Mission had been a minority denomination since an 1885 schism resulted in the establishment of the Free Church of Tonga as an independent body under the patronage of King George Tupou I. The schism was largely due to interpersonal conflict between church leaders, and Page arrived at a time when the relationship between the rival churches had begun to thaw. He succeeded veteran missionary James Egan Moulton as the dominant figure in the Wesleyan Mission, soon mastering the Tongan language and preaching in "stirring idiomatic Tongan".

Page was appointed principal of Tupou College, a position he held until succeeded by E. E. V. Collocott in 1915. He was also involved in the growth of Queen Salote College and the establishment of a government scholarship scheme for Tongan students to attend Newington College in Sydney. According to Sione Lātūkefu, the first Tongan to be awarded an academic doctorate, Page took a personal interest in his education and was the first to identify him as a candidate for postgraduate studies.

In 1912 Page married Hannah Morrison, with whom he had one son. He gained respect among the local population by lobbying on their behalf to William Telfer Campbell, the British consul, and assisting with relief efforts after hurricanes and the 1918 Spanish flu pandemic. Collocott recalled that during the flu pandemic Page "dispensed medicines to hundreds of people who came to him, and then, sick himself, he put his life in pawn and with horse and sulky, drove about the villages, distributing medicine, inspiring hope and courage".

=== Church reunification and presidency ===
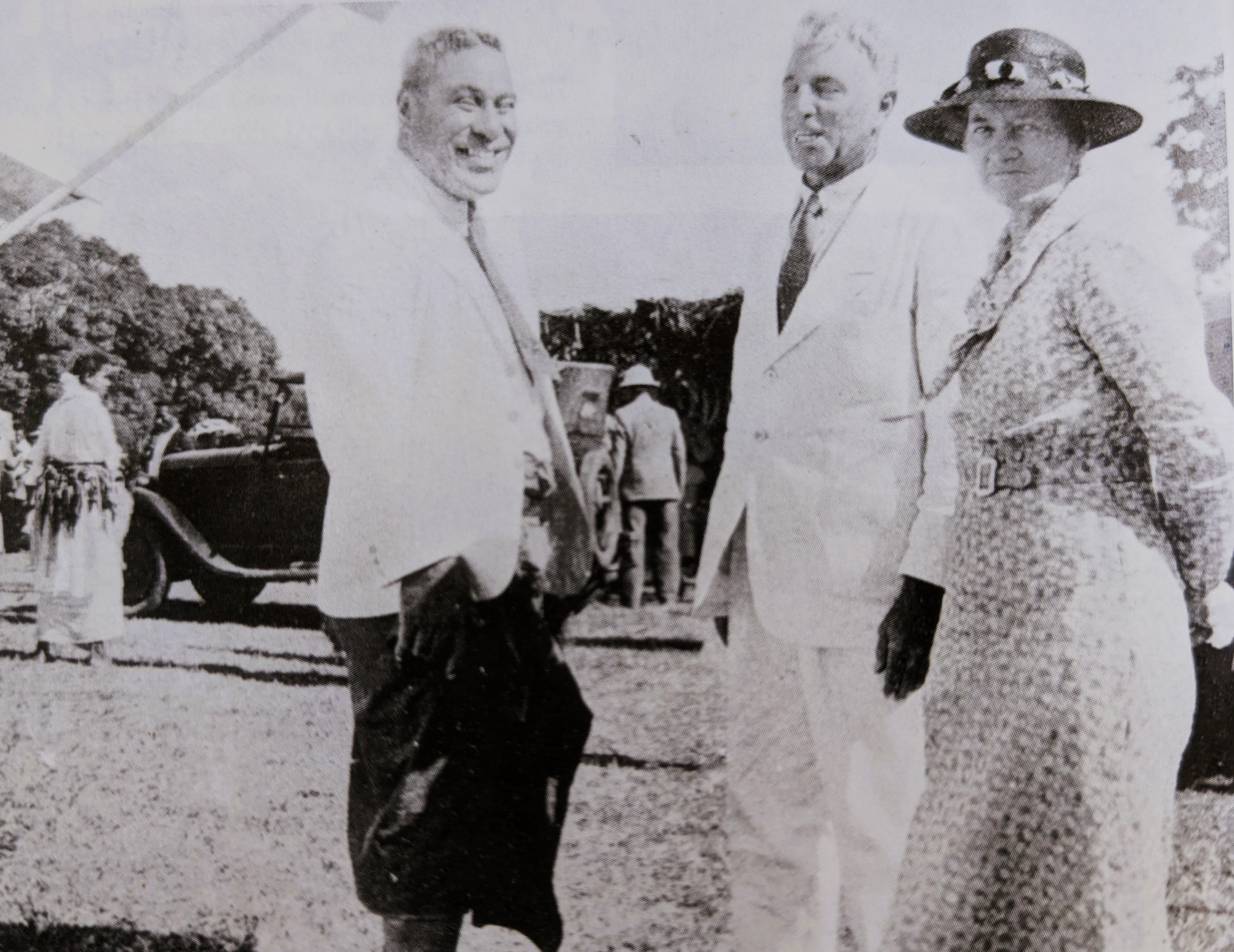
Page and his wife Hannah with Tongan consort Viliami Tungī Mailefihi in the 1930s

Page played an important role in the reunification of the Methodist Mission with the Free Church of Tonga, an initiative spearheaded by Queen Sālote after her accession in 1918. He developed a close relationship with Sālote through his friendship with her husband, Viliami Tungī Mailefihi, who had attended Wesleyan schools and been educated in Sydney. Sālote – a member of the Free Church – sought reunification for a number of reasons, including concerns over the Free Church's administration and finances, support for ecumenism, and a desire to attend the same church as her husband.

Moves towards reunification began in earnest in 1923 after Tungī was appointed premier. In October 1923, Sālote formally approached Page with a proposal for reunification. In February 1924, he and Free Church president Jabez Watkin joined a joint committee chaired by Sālote which resolved in favour of reunification, subject to approval by church bodies. The union went ahead in April 1924, with the unified church taking the name Free Wesleyan Church of Tonga and electing Setaleki Manu as its first president. However, by this time Watkin had withdrawn his support for the union and formed a Continuing Free Church of Tonga, which ultimately failed in a legal challenge to inherit the former Free Church's property.

In 1925, Page was elected president of the Free Wesleyan Church in place of Manu, whose marriage to a teenage girl had caused a scandal. He would be re-elected at every annual conference until his retirement in 1946. With its influx of members from the old Wesleyan Mission, the Free Wesleyan Church was the largest religious denomination in the country, with "buildings visible in every village". Page acknowledged Sālote as the temporal head of the church, which had previously been a source of conflict between Watkin and Sālote, and "did nothing of importance in the Church without consulting the Queen". This model was emulated throughout the church hierarchy, with ministers deferring to nobles and chiefs. In 1926 Page oversaw the church's formal affiliation with the Methodist Church of Australasia as an independent, self-governing Methodist conference.

Page's early years as president included a number of challenges relating to finance and administration. The Free Wesleyan Church also inherited its predecessors' debts, which were not paid off until 1944. The settlement of the Continuing Free Church's lawsuit did not resolve the church's land issues, as many church buildings were situated on land leased from local chiefs. Page unsuccessfully sought the intervention of the Privy Council of Tonga to enforce existing leases, and subsequently "acquired a reputation for being very canny in his negotiations with individual nobles". Page also advised Sālote on economic matters, representing Tonga at an economic conference in Auckland in 1936 and seeking advice from his brother Earle Page, a former federal treasurer of Australia. During World War II Sālote appointed him as Tonga's price commissioner.

=== Royal chaplain and advisor ===
Page was appointed as royal chaplain after the Methodist reunification in 1924, having impressed Sālote with his discretion and patience during the process. He was both her spiritual director and an advisor on secular matters, serving as an interpreter and translating her speeches into English. Tongan historian Sione Lātūkefu identified him as a power behind the throne, who "always prudently kept to the background". According to Elizabeth Wood-Ellem, a biographer of Sālote, Page was "not only her counsellor in her grief, her chaplain, a censor, and a member of the Home Guard, but also her unofficial adviser on almost everything". He was one of the only papālangi with easy access to the Royal Palace. In 1935, in Tungī's absence, he accompanied Sālote on a visit to Sydney where she was diagnosed with cancer and received a hysterectomy.

In 1939, Page's wife Hannah died after a brief illness. Sālote and Tungī arranged for Hannah to be given a chiefly funeral, providing taʻovala mats and tapa cloth, and allowing her to be interred at the royal burial ground. Tungī died two years later in 1941, with Page supporting Sālote through her own grieving process. As a papālangi, the tapu that prevented Tongans from approaching Sālote during mourning did not apply to him. Each day he would bring "a basket of food to the Palace [...] and persuade the Queen to eat a little of the food he had brought". Page also convinced Sālote that Tungī's former residence – which would ordinarily be considered tapu and burned to the ground – should instead be relocated to Tupou College where it became the residence of the college principal.

== Later life ==
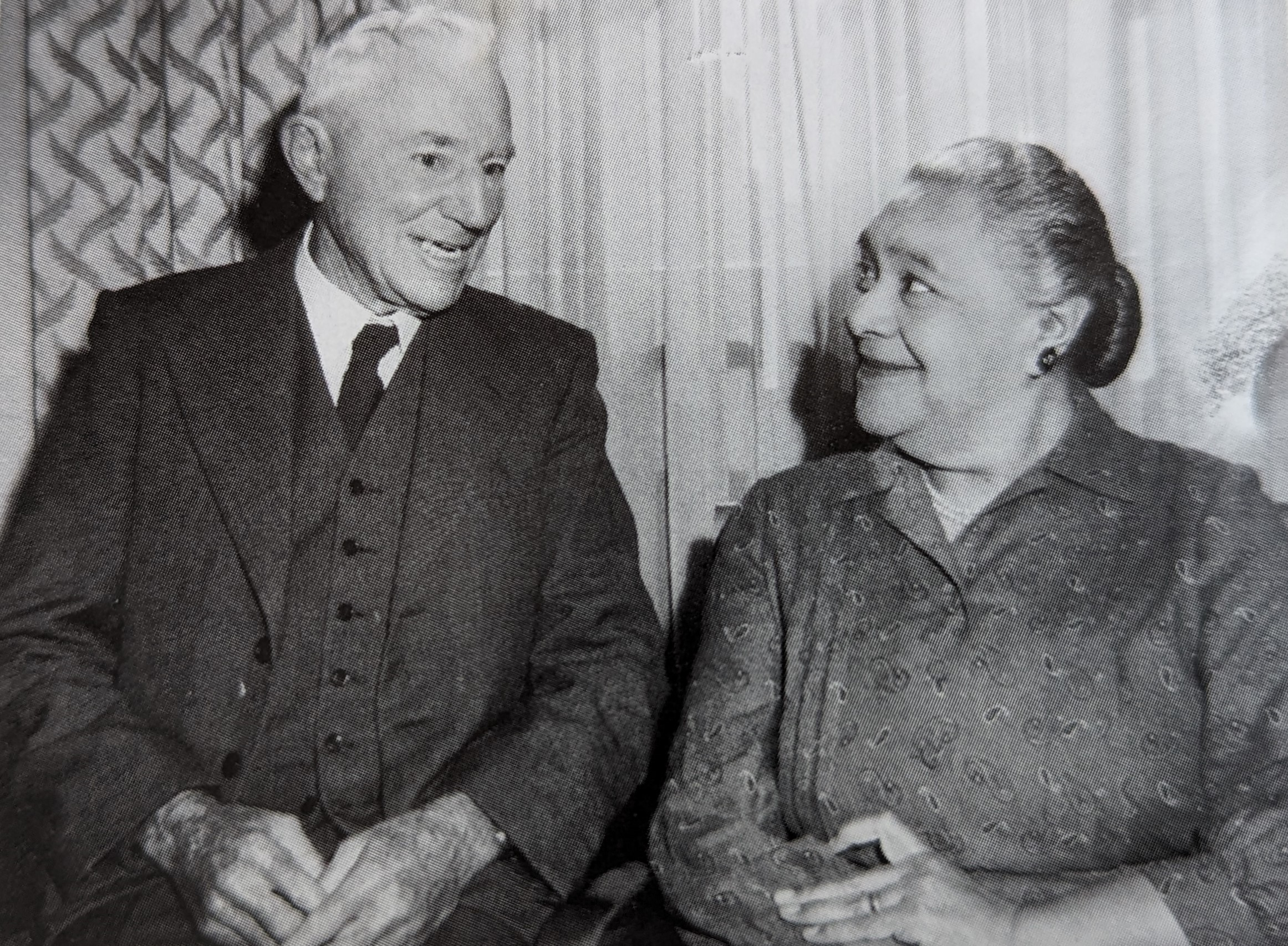
Page with Sālote in the early 1960s

Page retired to Sydney in 1946. His last major public appearance as church president had been to officiate at the 1945 celebrations to mark the centenary of King George Tupou I, a major event attended by Fijian and Samoan chiefs as well as British representatives. During World War II his brother Harold and nephew Robert had been killed by the Japanese.

In retirement, Page regularly met with Sālote on her visits to Australia. In June 1947, he was called out of retirement to officiate at the joint wedding of Crown Prince Tāufaʻāhau Tungi and Prince Fatafehi Tuʻipelehake to their respective brides Halaevalu Mataʻaho and Melenaite Tupou Moheofo. The wedding was a major event, with celebrations lasting several days and a significant portion of Tonga's population visiting the capital, Nukuʻalofa. Page also returned to Tonga in 1950 for the inauguration of work on the new Centenary Church in Nukuʻalofa, a pet project of Sālote. She continued to call on him for advice, including on the prospect of abdication which he counselled against.

Page died in Sydney on 2 July 1965, aged 86. After his death memorial services were held across all Free Methodist churches in Tonga. His ashes were returned to Tonga to be interred alongside those of his wife in the Malaʻe ʻAloa royal burial ground in Nukuʻalofa.

== Sources ==
- Forman, Charles W. (1978). "Tonga's tortured venture in church unity". The Journal of Pacific History. 13 (1): 3–21. doi:10.1080/00223347808572335.
- Wood-Ellem, Elizabeth (1983). "Sālote of Tonga and the Problem of National Unity". The Journal of Pacific History. 18 (3): 163–182. doi:10.1080/00223348308572466.
- Wood-Ellem, Elizabeth (1999). Queen Sālote of Tonga: The Story of an Era, 1900–1965. Auckland University Press.
