= Harold Page =

Australian public servant

Harold Page DSO, MC
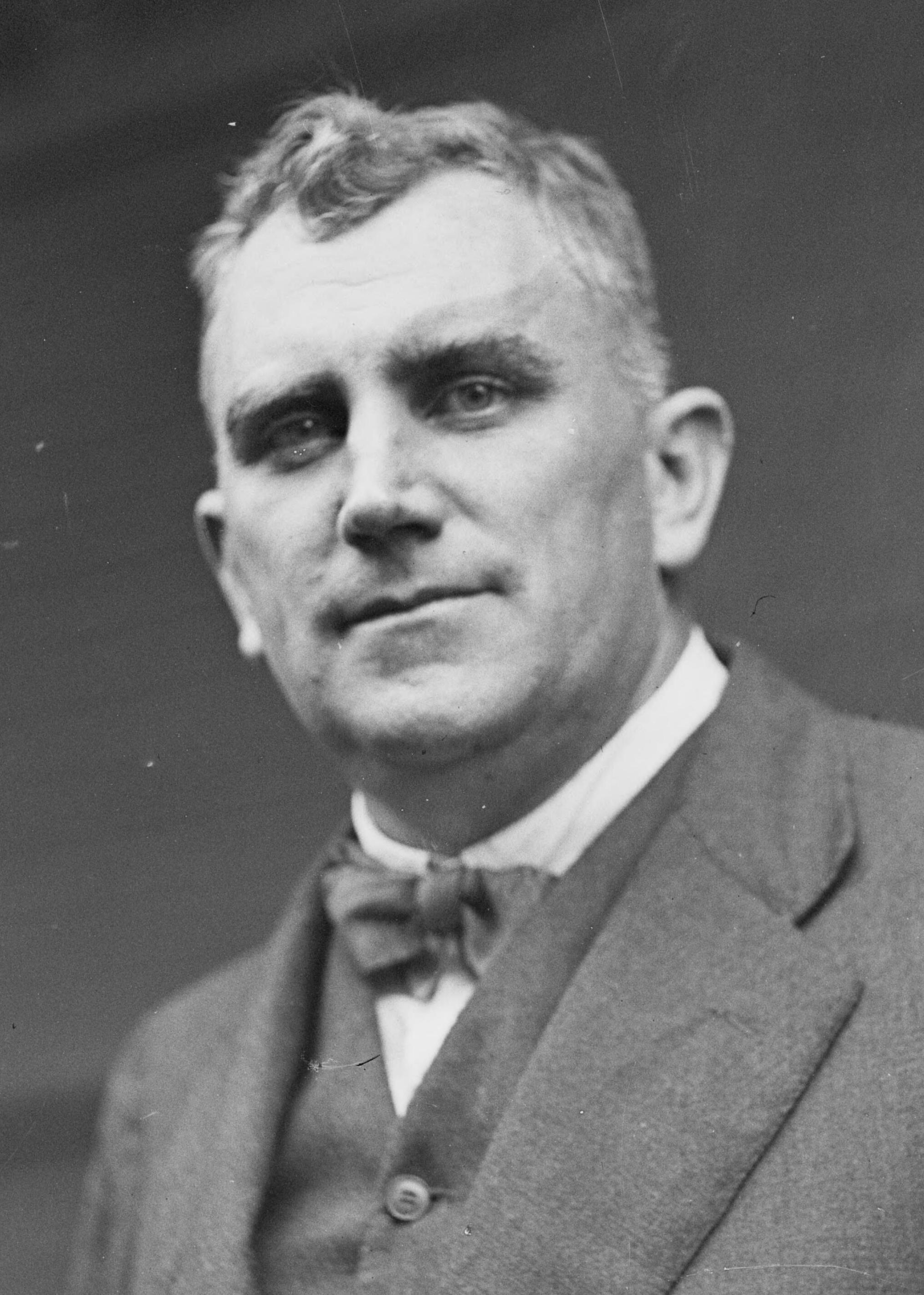
- Page c. 1930

Personal details
- Born: 8 August 1888 Grafton, New South Wales, Australia
- Died: 1 July 1942 (aged 53) at sea
- Spouse: Anne Brewster (m. 1919)
- Relations: Sir Earle Page (brother); Rodger Page (brother); Robert Page (son)
- Education: University of Sydney

Military service
- Allegiance: Australia
- Branch/service: Australian Imperial Force
- Years of service: 1915–1919
- Rank: Major
- Commands: 25th Battalion (acting)
- Battles/wars: First World War; Gallipoli campaign; Western Front
- Awards: Distinguished Service Order; Military Cross; Mentioned in Despatches

Major Harold Hillis Page DSO, MC (8 August 1888 – 1 July 1942) was an Australian Army officer and public servant. He rose from private to major during the First World War, and was temporary commander of the 25th Battalion on several occasions. He subsequently joined the Commonwealth Public Service and was posted to the Territory of New Guinea, serving as government secretary from 1923 and as acting administrator on a number of occasions. He was captured by the Japanese in 1942 and is listed among those killed in the sinking of the Montevideo Maru.

== Early life ==
Page was born on 8 August 1888 in Grafton, New South Wales, the eighth of eleven children born to Mary (née Cox) and Charles Page. His older brothers included Methodist missionary Rodger Page and Australian prime minister Sir Earle Page.

Page was educated at Grafton Public School. He joined the Department of Public Instruction and worked as a schoolteacher from 1904 to 1913. He also completed further studies at Sydney Teachers' College (1908–09) and the University of Sydney (1911–13; part-time). In 1913, Page joined the Commonwealth Public Service as a clerk in the Taxation Office, stationed at Lismore. He later worked in the electoral branch of the Department of Home Affairs.

== First World War ==
Page enlisted in the Australian Imperial Force (AIF) in February 1915, with the rank of private. He was commissioned as a second lieutenant in the 25th Battalion two months later. He arrived at Gallipoli in September, by which time he had been promoted lieutenant. During a nighttime reconnaissance mission on 29 October, Page and another soldier disabled two Ottoman soldiers and threw bombs into enemy trenches. He was wounded in action by enemy shelling in December, but was able to rejoin his unit in Egypt the following month.

The 25th Battalion arrived in France in March 1916, and Page was promoted captain in May. On 28 June, he led a successful raiding party of 70 men near Messines, during which he was wounded in the spine. He was subsequently awarded the Military Cross for "conspicuous gallantry during a raid on the enemy's trenches" showing "great coolness and courage". Page spent several months recovering in England, but rejoined his unit in November 1916. In 1917, he was detached to the AIF's administrative headquarters in London, where he oversaw military voting in the 1917 Australian federal election.

Page was promoted major in July 1917 and became second-in-command of the 25th Battalion. He was briefly captured by Germans in October, but managed to escape. He was the temporary commander of the battalion on several occasions in 1918, notably at the Battle of Hamel in July. Page was wounded in the abdomen at the Battle of Mont Saint-Quentin in September 1918, and spent the remaining months of the war in England. He was mentioned in despatches and awarded the Distinguished Service Order.

== New Guinea ==
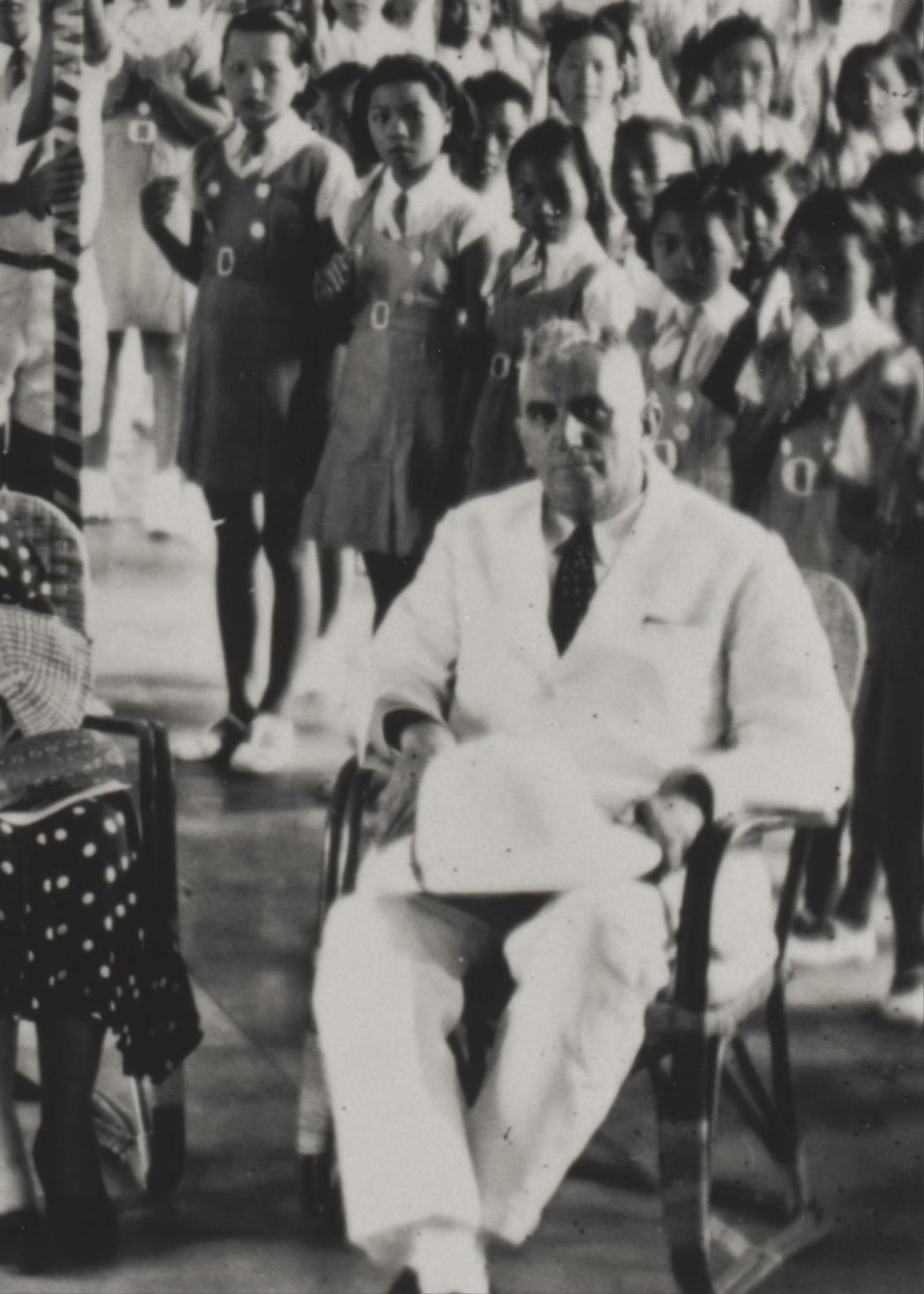
Page at Empire Day celebrations in Rabaul in 1941, with Chinese schoolchildren

Page received his discharge in July 1919 and returned to university, graduating Bachelor of Arts the following year. He rejoined the public service and was posted to the Territory of New Guinea, recently acquired by Australia as a League of Nations mandate. Page briefly served as chief of police and director of schools, then in 1923 was appointed government secretary. He was an ex officio member of the territory's executive council and legislative council. According to his obituary in Pacific Islands Monthly, he was "practically a certainty for the Administratorship of the Territory, the next time it became vacant".

As the most senior civil servant in the territory, Page was the deputy administrator and acted as territorial administrator on a number of occasions. In September 1941, he was made acting administrator at Rabaul when Administrator Walter McNicoll left for Lae. McNicoll subsequently fell ill with malaria, and Page became the main conduit to the federal government. He began evacuating women and children in December 1941, following the attack on Pearl Harbor, and in January 1942 sought permission from the Australian government to evacuate all white civilians from the territory. He was told that "unnecessary" civilians should be evacuated, but was refused permission for any administrative officers to leave.

The Japanese invaded Rabaul on 23 January 1942, and Page was taken prisoner. According to Gordon Thomas, editor of the Rabaul Times, he was forced to perform manual labour and was "frequently kicked and beaten". Nelson Tokiel of the New Guinea Police Force recalled hearing that Page and 20 others had been imprisoned in a tunnel and "only occasionally, under heavy guard, allowed out to wash themselves".

Page is listed among those who were aboard the unmarked prisoner of war ship Montevideo Maru when it was torpedoed and sunk by an American submarine on 1 July 1942. However, there were unconfirmed reports that senior officials had been executed prior to the ship leaving Rabaul. After his death, Page's widow donated a large decorative wooden cross to the Rabaul Methodist Church in his memory.

== Personal life ==
Page married Anne Miller Brewster on 5 June 1919. The couple had two sons and three daughters together, including Robert Page who, as a member of Z Special Unit, was executed by the Japanese for espionage in 1945.
