= John Joseph Scanlan (soldier) =

Australian Army officer (1890–1962)

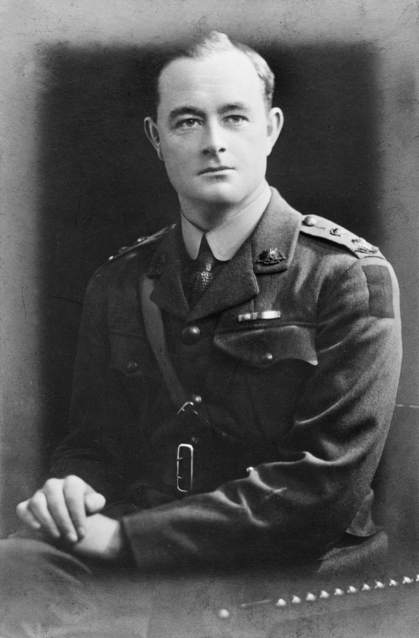
- Lieutenant Colonel J. J. Scanlan (c. 1919)
- Born: 19 October 1890; South Melbourne, Victoria
- Died: 6 December 1962 (aged 72); Kingston, Tasmania
- Military career
- Allegiance: Australia
- Branch: Australian Army
- Rank: Lieutenant Colonel
- Commands: 59th Battalion; Lark Force
- Conflicts: First World War; Gallipoli Campaign; Battle of Amiens; Battle of Mont Saint-Quentin; Battle of St. Quentin Canal; Second World War; Battle of Rabaul
- Awards: Distinguished Service Order & Bar; Mentioned in Despatches (3); Legion of Honour (France)

Lieutenant Colonel John Joseph Scanlan, DSO & Bar (19 October 1890 – 6 December 1962) was an Australian Army officer who served during the First and Second World Wars.

== Early life ==
John Joseph Scanlan was born in South Melbourne, Victoria, on 19 October 1890, to John Andrew Scanlan and Mary Josephine née McMahon. He attended Christian Brothers College, St Kilda, after which he worked as a shipping clerk at the Customs Department. He joined the Citizens Military Force in 1910 and was initially posted to 5th Battalion (Victorian Scottish Regiment). Two years later, by then a sergeant, he transferred to 60th Battalion. He was commissioned as a second lieutenant in the 58th Infantry (Essendon Rifles) in July 1913.

== First World War ==
Following the outbreak of the First World War, Scanlan enlisted in the Australian Imperial Force (AIF). Appointed a second lieutenant, he was posted to the newly raised 7th Battalion, which was to be part of the 1st Division. After departing Australia in October, he along with the rest of the battalion spent the remainder of 1914 and early 1915 in Egypt.

A lieutenant since February, Scalan was amongst the first of his battalion to land at Gallipoli on 25 April 1915. A chest wound received on 8 May during the Second Battle of Krithia ended his participation in the Gallipoli Campaign and he was evacuated to Egypt. After convalescing for over a year, firstly in Egypt and then Australia, he was posted to the 59th Battalion, then recuperating in England after the Battle of Fromelles. Promoted to captain on 1 November 1916, and then to major on 20 February 1917, he held a number of staff positions at brigade and divisional level. He briefly commanded the 57th Battalion in late January 1918 before being promoted to lieutenant colonel on 6 February and given command of the 59th Battalion at the age of 27.

Scanlan ably led the battalion during the battles of Amiens and Mont Saint-Quentin and finally, in late September, the St. Quentin Canal. After the latter battle, the battalion was placed in reserve for rest and recuperation, a period during which the war ended. Scanlan returned to Australia in 1919 having been awarded the Distinguished Service Order and a Bar, and the French Legion of Honour, as well as being mentioned in despatches three times. On 1 August 1919, his service with the AIF was terminated.

== Interwar period ==
Returning to civilian life, Scanlan first worked as a secretary for the Victorian Prices Commission before turning his hand to farming. During the late 1920s and early 1930s, he was involved with the Sustenance Department. In 1936, he moved to Tasmania as the deputy governor of Hobart Gaol.

== Second World War ==
Following the outbreak of the Second World War, Scanlan was called up from the Reserve of Officers (having been placed on the reserve in 1920) and put in command of the 6th Garrison Battalion. In September 1941 he was put in command of Lark Force, which was tasked with the defence of Rabaul, in New Britain. Lark Force was a mixture of regular Australian Army troops (the bulk of whom came from the 2/22nd Battalion) and locally raised militia, a total of 1,400 men. When the Japanese Empire invaded Rabaul on 23 January 1942 in what is now known as the Battle of Rabaul, the force was quickly overrun and forced to take to the jungle. When 160 captured Australian soldiers were massacred by the Japanese, Scanlan opted to surrender. He spent the remainder of the war as a prisoner of war.

== Later life ==
In 1946, Scanlan took up the position of governor at his former workplace, the Hobart Gaol, a position to which he had been appointed while still a prisoner of war.

Scanlan died on 6 December 1962 in a hospital at Kingston, Tasmania of a coronary occlusion. He was survived by his wife, son and daughter.
