= Battle of Rabaul (1942) =

WWII battle in the Pacific Theater

- Part of the New Guinea campaign of the Pacific Theater (World War II)
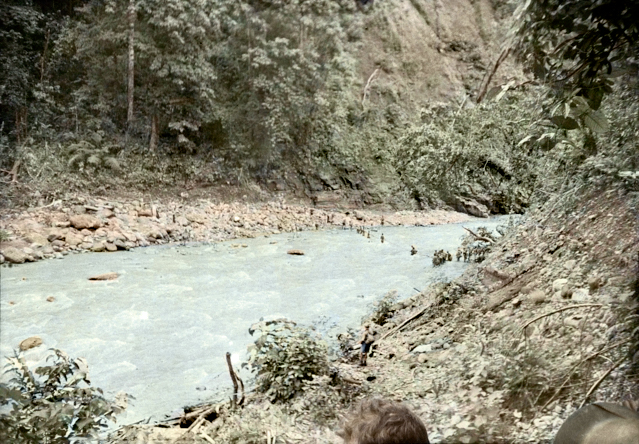
- Late January 1942. Australian soldiers (right centre) retreating from Rabaul cross the Warangoi/Adler River in the Bainings Mountains, on the eastern side of Gazelle Peninsula. Photographer: Sgt L. I. H. (Les) Robbins.
Date	23 January – February 1942
Location	Rabaul, New Britain; Territory of New Guinea 4°11′53″S 152°10′05″E
Result	Japanese victory

Belligerents
Australia	Japan

Commanders and leaders
(Australia) John Scanlan (surrendered)	(Empire of Japan) Shigeyoshi Inoue (Empire of Japan) Tomitaro Horii

Strength
1,400 soldiers (New Britain); 130 soldiers (New Ireland); 24 Squadron RAAF (10 Wirraway trainer aircraft and 4 Hudson light aircraft, approximately 200 ground personnel).	15,000 soldiers (New Britain)

Casualties and losses
6 aircrew killed 5 aircrew wounded 28 soldiers killed 1,000 soldiers captured 4 aircraft shot down 2 damaged aircraft crashed	16 killed 49 wounded at least 2 aircraft shot down 4 aircraft lost in accidents

The Battle of Rabaul, also known by the Japanese as Operation R, an instigating action of the New Guinea campaign, was fought on the island of New Britain in the Australian Territory of New Guinea, from 23 January into February 1942. It was a strategically significant defeat of Allied forces by Japan in the Pacific campaign of World War II, with the Japanese invasion force quickly overwhelming the small Australian garrison, the majority of which was either killed or captured. Hostilities on the neighbouring island of New Ireland are usually considered to be part of the same battle. Rabaul was significant because of its proximity to the Japanese territory of the Caroline Islands, site of a major Imperial Japanese Navy base on Truk.

Following the capture of the port of Rabaul, Japanese forces turned it into a major base and proceeded to land on mainland New Guinea, advancing toward Port Moresby. Heavy fighting followed along the Kokoda Track, and around Milne Bay, before the Japanese were eventually pushed back towards Buna–Gona by early 1943. As part of Operation Cartwheel, throughout 1943–1945, Allied forces later sought to isolate the Japanese garrison on Rabaul, rather than capturing it, largely using air power to do so, with US and Australian ground forces pursuing a limited campaign in western New Britain during this time.

By the end of the war, there was still a sizeable garrison at Rabaul, with large quantities of equipment that were subsequently abandoned. In the aftermath, it took the Allies over two years to repatriate the captured Japanese soldiers, while clean up efforts continued past the late 1950s. Many relics including ships, aircraft and weapons, as well as abandoned positions and tunnels, remain in the area.

== Prelude ==
Rabaul lies on the eastern end of the island of New Britain. At the time of the battle, the town was the capital of the Australian-administered Territory of New Guinea, having been captured from the Germans in 1914. In March 1941, the Australians dispatched a small garrison to the region, as tensions with Japan heightened. The small Australian Army garrison in New Britain was built around Lieutenant Colonel Howard Carr's 700-strong 2/22nd Battalion, an Australian Imperial Force (AIF) infantry battalion. This battalion formed part of Lark Force, which eventually numbered 1,400 men and was commanded by Lieutenant Colonel John Scanlan. The force also included personnel from a local Militia unit, the New Guinea Volunteer Rifles (NGVR), a coastal defence battery, an anti-aircraft battery, an anti-tank battery and a detachment of the 2/10th Field Ambulance. The 2/22nd Battalion Band—which was also included in Lark Force—is perhaps the only military unit ever to have been entirely recruited from the ranks of the Salvation Army. A commando unit, the 130-strong 2/1st Independent Company, was detached to garrison the nearby island of New Ireland.

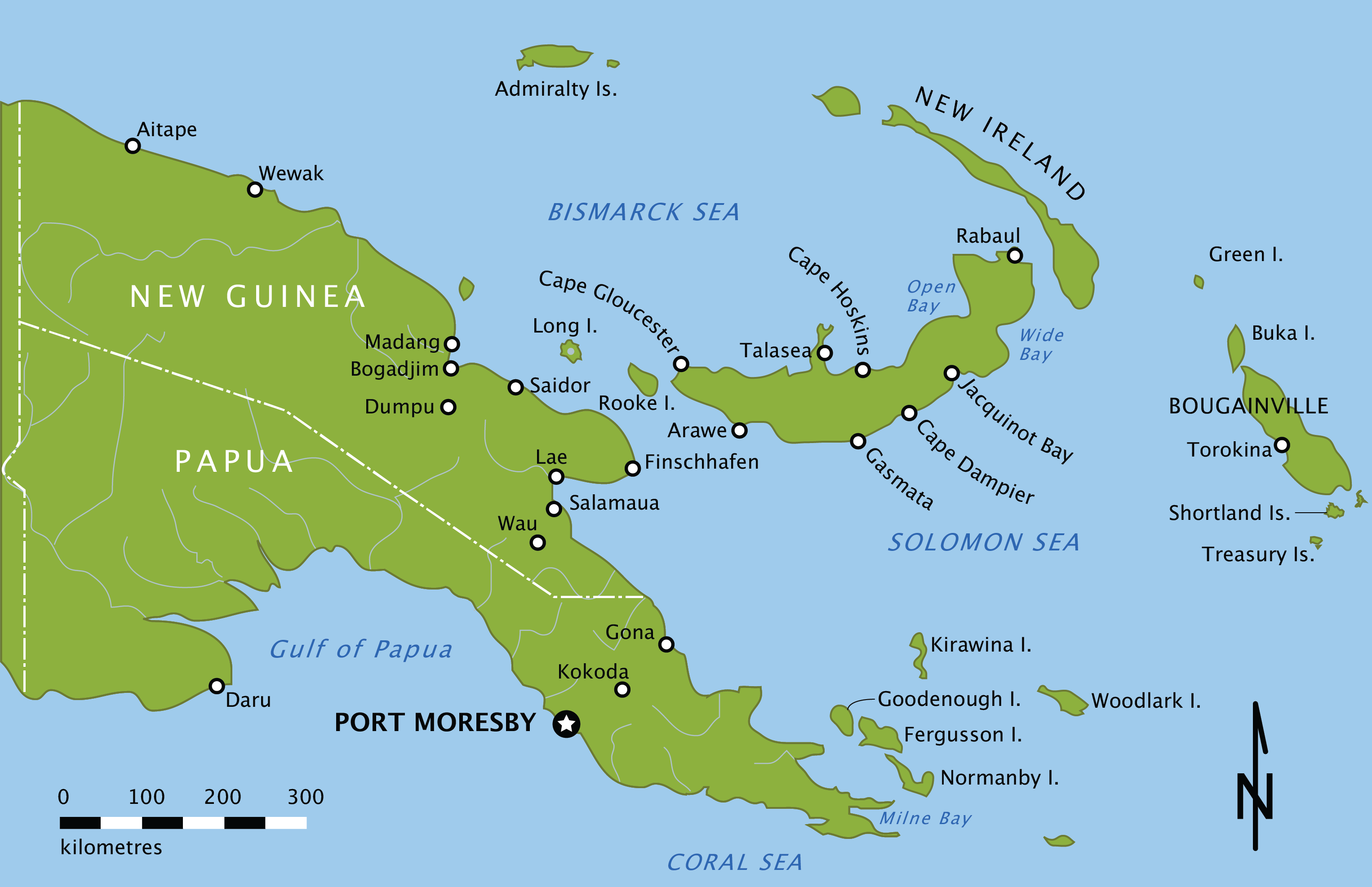
Map depicting eastern New Guinea and New Britain

Throughout 1941, the Allies had planned to build Rabaul up as a "secure fleet anchorage" with plans to establish a radar station and a strong defensive minefield; however, these plans were ultimately shelved. Allied planners later determined that they did not have the capacity to expand the garrison around Rabaul, nor was the naval situation conducive to reinforcing it should the garrison come under attack. Nevertheless, the decision was made that the garrison would remain in place to hold Rabaul as a forward observation post. The main tasks of the garrison were protection of Vunakanau, the main Royal Australian Air Force (RAAF) airfield near Rabaul, and the nearby flying boat anchorage in Simpson Harbour, which were important for the surveillance of Japanese movements in the region. However, the RAAF contingent, under Wing Commander John Lerew, had little offensive capability with only 10 lightly armed CAC Wirraway training aircraft and four Lockheed Hudson light bombers from No. 24 Squadron.

For the Japanese, Rabaul was important because of its proximity to the Caroline Islands, which was the site of a major Imperial Japanese Navy base on Truk. The capture of New Britain offered them a deep water harbour and airfields to provide protection to Truk and also to interdict Allied lines of communication between the United States and Australia. Following the capture of Guam, the South Seas Detachment, under Major General Tomitaro Horii, was tasked with capturing Kavieng and Rabaul as part of "Operation R".

Japanese planning began with aerial reconnaissance of the town, which sought to identify the dispositions of the defending troops. Planners, who had been flown from Guam to Truk, determined three possible schemes of manoeuvre based on these dispositions: a landing near Kokop, aimed at establishing a beachhead; a landing on the north coast of Rabaul, followed by a drive on Rabaul from behind the main defences; or a multi-pronged landing focused on capturing the airfields and centre of the town. They settled upon the third option. The Japanese established a brigade group based on the 55th Division. Its main combat units were the 144th Infantry Regiment, which consisted of a headquarters unit, three infantry battalions, an artillery company, signals unit, and a munitions squad, as well as a few platoons from the 55th Cavalry Regiment, a battalion from the 55th Mountain Artillery Regiment and a company from the 55th Engineer Regiment. These forces would be supported by a large naval task force, and landing operations would be preceded by a heavy aerial campaign aimed at destroying Allied air assets in region so they could not interfere with the landing operations.

== Battle ==
In December 1941, shortly before Japanese air raids began, most civilian men were forced to stay in Rabaul, but women who were not necessary to the defence of the base were evacuated. From 4 January 1942, Rabaul came under attack by large numbers of Japanese carrier-based aircraft. After the odds facing the Australians mounted significantly, Lerew signalled RAAF headquarters in Melbourne with the Latin phrase "Nos Morituri Te Salutamus" ("we who are about to die salute you"), supposedly uttered by gladiators in ancient Rome before entering combat.

The Japanese force steamed from Truk on 14 January, bound for Rabaul, joined by a naval task force of four aircraft carriers— Kaga, Akagi, Shokaku and Zuikaku — seven cruisers, 14 destroyers, and auxiliary vessels and submarines commanded by Vice Admiral Shigeyoshi Inoue. On 20 January, over 100 Japanese aircraft attacked Rabaul in multiple waves. Of the eight RAAF Wirraways that met the attacks, three were shot down, two crash-landed, and another was damaged. Six Australian aircrew were killed in action and five wounded. One of the attacking Japanese bombers was shot down by anti-aircraft fire. The intense air attacks destroyed the Australian coastal artillery and forced the Australian infantry to withdraw from Rabaul. The following day, an RAAF Catalina flying boat crew spotted the invasion fleet off Kavieng, and signalled its location before being shot down.

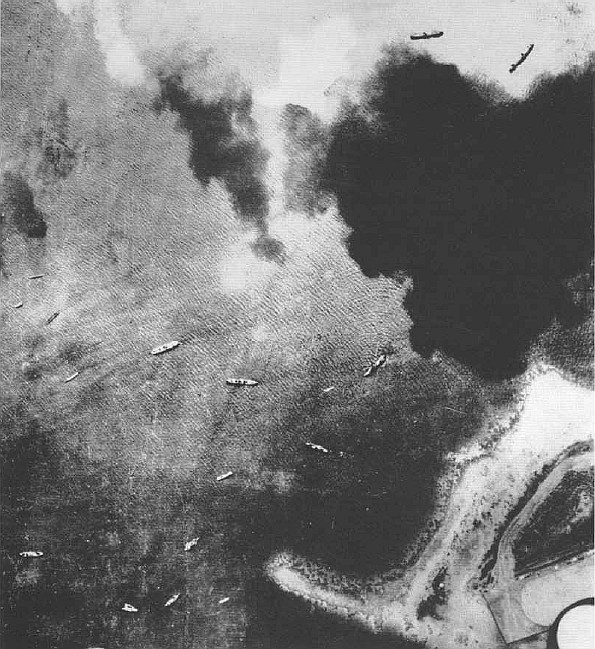
Japanese fleet to be employed in the invasion of Rabaul, photographed by an RAAF Hudson over Truk on 9 January 1942

=== RAAF defences ===
RAAF Townsville command ordered 24 Squadron repeatedly to bomb the Japanese ships with whatever aircraft available, though the order came after the squadron had relocated to Lae with just a damaged Wirraway, a second Wirraway lacking bomb pylons, and a Hudson. Near dusk on 21 January the Hudson launched with a light payload intended for the Japanese fleet concentrated near Kavieng, but turned back due to darkness. The remaining Hudson, with a malfunctioning engine, departed at 0300 on 22 January to evacuate severely wounded RAAF personnel to Australia, in violation of Townsville's orders.

After the Hudson's departure on 22 January, the RAAF personnel demolished Vunakanau's base infrastructure, including runways and ammunition. At 1600 hours Lark force engineers conducted a 'botched demolition' of nearly two thousand aerial bombs unloaded from the transport Herstein. Detonating them simultaneously the explosion leveled buildings over a quarter mile radius and caused extensive damage as far as half a mile, killing numerous natives caught in the open.

=== Preparatory bombardment ===
The bombing continued around Rabaul on 22 January, with a targeted carrier strike destroying most of the coastal batteries and killing or wounding twenty Australian gunners and destroying infrastructure. Japanese dive bombing attempts failed to destroy the two anti-aircraft guns overlooking Vunakanau. One of Kaga's Zero fighters piloted by FPO 2nd Class Isao Hiraishi was brought down near the sea, the only combat loss of that day's raid, though two of the attacking Val dive bombers crash landed near their carriers.

=== New Ireland landings ===
At 0230 hours a Japanese force of between 3,000 and 4,000 troops landed at three locations off New Ireland, wading ashore in deep water with dangerous mud pools. The defenders of 2/1st Independent Company had been dispersed around the island, and the Japanese took the main town of Kavieng without opposition. After a sharp fight around the airfield the commandos fell back towards the Sook River. That night, the invasion fleet approached Rabaul, and before dawn on 23 January, the South Seas Force entered Simpson Harbour and a force of around 5,000 troops, mainly from the 144th Infantry Regiment, commanded by Colonel Masao Kusunose, landed on New Britain.

=== Ground fighting ===
Australian ground troops had deployed on the western shore of Blanche Bay to meet the landing, and a series of desperate actions followed near the beaches around Simpson Harbour, Keravia Bay and Raluana Point. A mixed company of Australians from the 2/22nd and the NGVR at Vulcan Beach held up the 3rd Battalion, 144th Infantry Regiment, under the command of Lieutenant Colonel Kuwada Ishiro. Elsewhere the other two battalions of the South Seas Force landed at unguarded locations and moved inland. Within hours, Lakunai airfield was captured by the Japanese. Thinking the situation hopeless, Scanlan ordered "every man for himself", and Australian soldiers and civilians retreated through the jungle in small groups up to company size, moving along the north and south coasts. During the fighting on 23 January, the Australians lost two officers and 26 other ranks killed in action.

Only the RAAF had made evacuation plans. Although ordered to turn his ground staff into infantrymen for a last-ditch defence the island, Lerew insisted they be evacuated by flying boat and his one remaining Hudson. After Rabaul's capture, Japanese mopping up operations began 24 January. Australian soldiers remained at large in the interior of New Britain for weeks, but Lark Force had not prepared for guerrilla warfare on New Britain. Without supplies, their health and military effectiveness declined. Leaflets posted by Japanese patrols or dropped from planes stated in English, "you can find neither food nor way of escape in this island and you will only die of hunger unless you surrender." The Japanese commander, Horii, ordered the 3rd Battalion, 144th Infantry Regiment to search the southern part of the Gazelle Peninsula and secure the remaining Australians. A follow up landing by the Japanese at Gasmata, on New Britain's south coast, on 9 February, cut the Australian line of retreat and over 1,000 Australians became prisoners in the following weeks. The Japanese reorganised on a line along the Keravat River to prevent possible counterattacks.

== Aftermath ==
=== Casualties ===
From mainland New Guinea, some civilians and individual officers from the Australian New Guinea Administrative Unit organised unofficial rescue missions to New Britain, and between March and May about 450 troops and civilians were evacuated by sea. Notwithstanding these efforts, Allied losses, particularly in relation to personnel captured, were very high, and casualties were heavily in favour of the Japanese. The Allies lost six aircrew killed and five wounded, along with 28 soldiers killed in action, and over 1,000 captured. Against this, the Japanese lost only 16 killed and 49 wounded.

==== Tol Plantation massacre ====
Of the over 1,000 Australian soldiers taken prisoner, around 160 were massacred on or about 4 February in four separate incidents around Tol and Waitavalo. Six men survived these killings and later described what had happened to a Court of Inquiry. The Australian government concluded the prisoners were marched into the jungle near Tol Plantation in small groups and were then shot and bayoneted by Japanese soldiers. At the nearby Waitavalo Plantation, another group of Australian prisoners were shot. The Allies later placed responsibility for the incident on Masao Kusunose, the commanding officer of the 144th Infantry Regiment, but in late 1946 he starved himself to death before he could stand trial. At least 800 soldiers and 200 civilian prisoners of war—most of them Australian—lost their lives on 1 July 1942, when the ship on which they were being transported from Rabaul to Japan, the Montevideo Maru, was sunk off the north coast of Luzon by the U.S. submarine USS Sturgeon.

=== Subsequent operations ===
According to Japanese author Kengoro Tanaka, the operation to capture Rabaul was the only completely successful Japanese operation of the New Guinea campaign. The Japanese quickly repaired the airfield, and Rabaul became the largest Japanese base in New Guinea and the linchpin to their defences in the region. The Australians tried to impede Rabaul's development by a bombing counter-attack in March. The Japanese extended their control across New Britain, establishing airfields at Cape Gloucester on the island's western tip and several small coastal outposts for small boats travelling between Rabaul and New Guinea. A handful of Lark Force members remained at large on New Britain and New Ireland and, in conjunction with the local islanders, conducted guerrilla operations against the Japanese, serving mainly as coastwatchers, providing information of Japanese shipping movements.

The Japanese followed up the capture of Rabaul with further operations on mainland New Guinea, beginning with the capture of the Salamaua–Lae region beginning in March 1942. Throughout 1942 and into early 1943, the Allies and Japanese fought along the Kokoda Track, at Milne Bay and around Buna–Gona as the Japanese advanced south towards Port Moresby. By mid-1943, the tide turned in favour of the Allies, who began an offensive to advance north through New Guinea and the Solomon Islands. By late November 1943 Japanese forces in Rabaul had been reduced by airpower, with a large raid being mounted from the aircraft carriers Saratoga and Princeton on 5 November. According to author Eric Larrabee, "thereafter no Japanese heavy ships ever came to Rabaul."

Allied planners dismissed capturing Rabaul in favor of isolating and bypassing it as part of Operation Cartwheel. In December 1943, U.S. Marines and Army soldiers landed in western New Britain at Arawe and Cape Gloucester. Subsequent Allied operations on New Britain constricted the Japanese force around Rabaul. In November 1944, the Australians returned to the island when elements of the 5th Division landed at Jacquinot Bay on the south coast and relieved the US 40th Infantry Division. The Australians then conducted landings around the island as they conducted a limited advance north, securing a line across the base of the Gazelle Peninsula between Wide Bay and Open Bay. Japanese forces around Rabaul remained isolated until Japan surrendered in August 1945, when there were still around 69,000 Japanese troops there.

Large quantities of equipment were subsequently abandoned around Rabaul after the war, and it took over two years for the Allies to repatriate the Japanese garrison that was captured after Japan surrendered. In the late 1950s, Japanese salvage companies began work to salvage many of the ship wrecks around Rabaul. Many abandoned positions, tunnels, and equipment relics such as aircraft and weapons can still be found in the area.
