= Power behind the throne =

Informal influence over a political figure

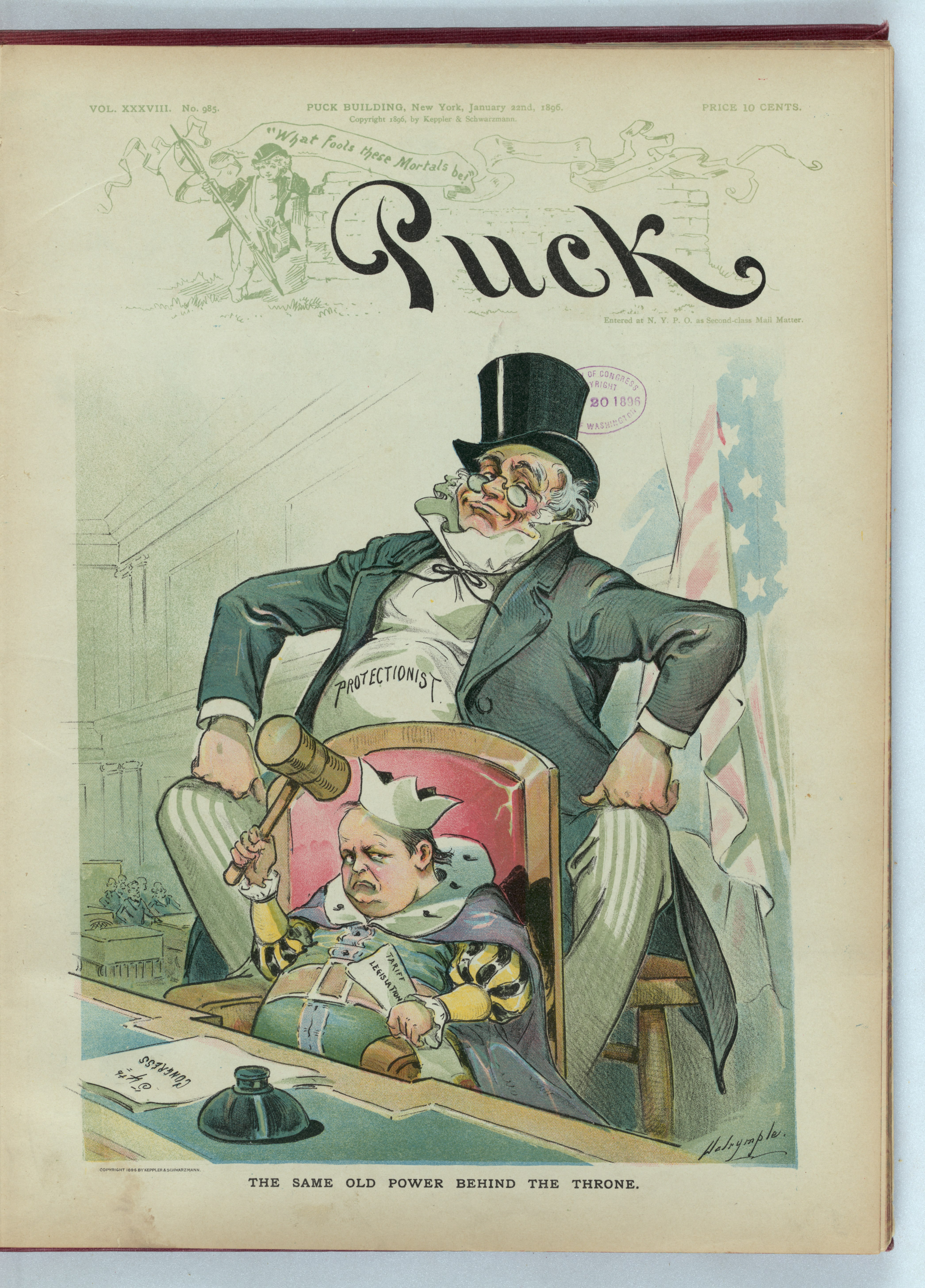
The same old power behind the throne / Dalrymple.

The phrase "power behind the throne" refers to a person or group that is understood to de facto wield the power of a high-ranking official (for example, a monarch), or whose support must be maintained to continue in office. In politics, it most commonly refers to a nominal subordinate or advisor to an officeholder (often called a "figurehead") who serves as de facto leader, setting policy through their influence. A similar meaning is conveyed by the term éminence grise.

== Examples ==
Some examples of a "power behind the throne" include the Crown Prince and Prime Minister of Saudi Arabia, Mohammed bin Salman, who effectively rules the country for his 90-year old father King Salman. Mohammed bin Zayed Al Nahyan of Abu Dhabi, who acted on behalf of Emir and President of the UAE Khalifa bin Zayed Al Nahyan after he suffered a stroke in 2014, was often considered the de facto president of the UAE until Khalifa's death in 2022. In Qatar, Hamad bin Jassim bin Jaber Al Thani was often called the power behind the throne of Hamad bin Khalifa Al Thani. In Tonga, Australian missionary Rodger Page emerged as the most influential adviser of Queen Sālote, serving as royal chaplain to her for over 20 years. In Mexico, Joseph-Marie Córdoba Montoya, a naturalized Mexican of French origin, was chief of staff during the term of President Carlos Salinas de Gortari (1988–1994), and was considered the second-most powerful person in Mexico at the time. Diego Portales of Chile, who had significant influence in the political life of his country in early 1830s, reflected in the Constitution of 1833.

== Related terms ==
A related term is éminence grise (French: "gray eminence"), a powerful advisor or decision-maker who operates secretly or otherwise unofficially. This phrase was popularized by Aldous Huxley in referring to Cardinal Richelieu's right-hand man, François Leclerc du Tremblay (also known as the Père Joseph), a Capuchin friar who wore grey robes. Martin Bormann was referred to as the Brown Eminence, brown referring to the brown uniform of the Nazi Party.

== See also ==
- Cabal
- Deep state
- Figurehead
- Ginger group
- Kitchen Cabinet
- Kingmaker
- Shadow government (conspiracy theory)
