= Lark Force =

Second World War Australian Army formation

- Active: March 1941 - January 1942
- Country: Australia
- Branch: Australian Army
- Type: Composite force
- Role: Garrison
- Garrison/HQ: Rabaul; Kavieng
- Engagements: Battle of Rabaul (1942)

Commanders
- Notable commanders: John J. Scanlan

Lark Force was an Australian Army formation established in March 1941 during World War II for service in New Britain and New Ireland. Under the command of Lieutenant Colonel John Scanlan, it was raised in Australia and deployed to Rabaul and Kavieng, aboard SS Katoomba, MV Neptuna and HMAT Zealandia, to defend their strategically important harbours and airfields.

The objective of the force, was to maintain a forward air observation line as long as possible and to make the enemy fight for this line rather than abandon it at the first threat as the force was considered too small to withstand any invasion.

Most of Lark Force was captured by the Imperial Japanese Army after Rabaul and Kavieng were captured in January 1942. The officers of Lark Force were taken to Japan, but while the NCOs and men were being transported to the Chinese island of Hainan aboard the Montevideo Maru, the ship was torpedoed and sunk by the USS Sturgeon. Only a handful of the Japanese crew were rescued but none of the between 1,050 and 1,053 prisoners survived, because they were still locked below deck.

== Units ==
The Allied garrison consisted of the following units:

- 2/22nd Battalion
- 17th Antitank Battery
- a detachment of Royal Australian Artillery
- a company of Royal Australian Engineers
- an anti-aircraft battery
- supply, signals and medical detachments
- 80 militiamen of the New Guinea Volunteer Rifles
- 1st Independent Company (Kavieng, New Ireland)
- 2/10th Field Ambulance, Australian Army Medical Corps

== See also ==
- Sisters of War
