= 1st Independent Company (Australia) =

Australian military unit in World War II

No.1 Independent Company
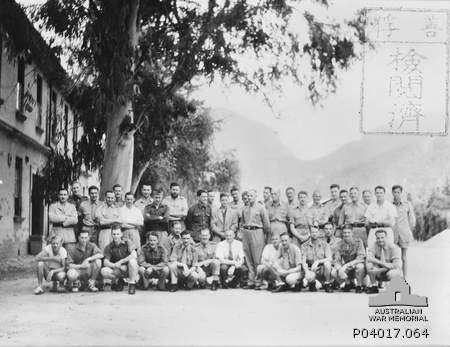
- Australian prisoners of war, including members of the No.1 Independent Company, in Japan c. 1942–45.
- Active: 1941–1942
- Country: Australia
- Branch: Australian Army
- Type: Independent Company and later Commando
- Role: Irregular warfare
- Size: 17 officers, 256 other ranks
- Double diamonds: Dark green
- Engagements: World War II: New Guinea campaign

Commanders
- Notable commanders: Major James Edmonds-Wilson

Insignia
- Unit colour patch

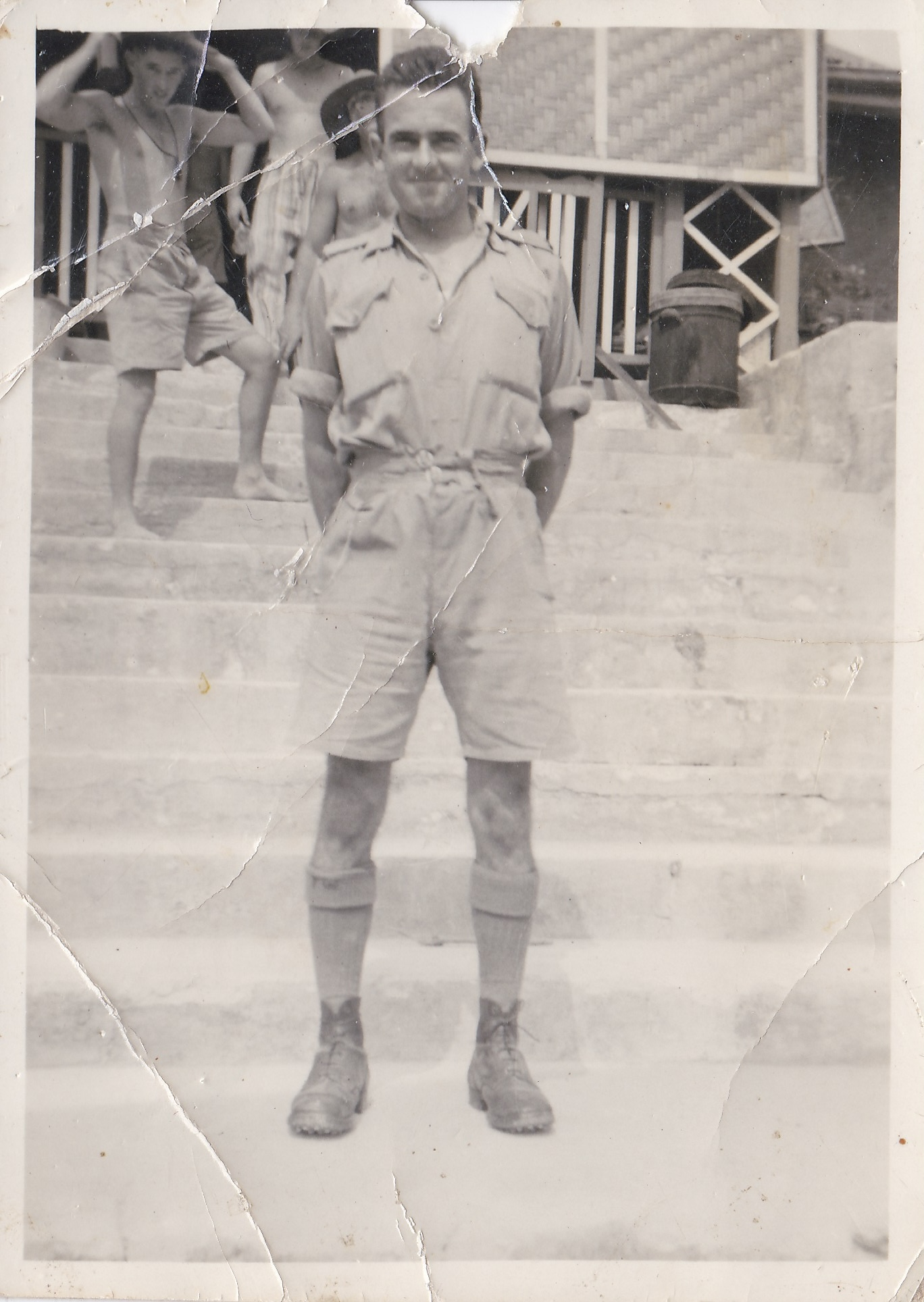
Signaller Thomas Watson WX7307 in Kavieng, New Ireland, a month before Japan invaded.

The 1st Independent Company was one of twelve independent or commando companies raised by the Australian Army for service in World War II. Raised in 1941, No. 1 Independent Company served in New Ireland, New Britain and New Guinea in the early stages of the war in the Pacific, taking part in a major commando raid on Salamaua in June 1942. Having lost a large number of men captured by the enemy as well as a number of battle casualties, the company was withdrawn from New Britain later in 1942. The company was subsequently disbanded, with its surviving members being transferred to other commando units, and it was never re-raised.

== History ==
No. 1 Independent Company was formed in May/June 1941 and was trained at the No. 7 Infantry Training Centre at Darby River on Wilsons Promontory in Victoria. Originally the company was raised to serve in the Middle East although, at that time there was uncertainty about the role that the company would fill there. Indeed, within the Australian Army there was a section that saw no need for the independent companies, believing that they would prove to be more of a drain on resources than anything else. However, later in 1941, as the threat of war with Imperial Japan loomed, the main body of the company was sent to Kavieng, New Ireland, to protect Kavieng airfield whilst other sections were sent to Namatanai on New Ireland, Vila in the New Hebrides, Tulagi on Guadalcanal, Buka on Bougainville, and Lorengau on Manus Island to act as observers and provided medical treatment to the inhabitants.

Commanded by Major James Edmonds-Wilson, in the event of an invasion of New Britain by the Japanese the 1st Independent Company was under orders to resist long enough to destroy key airfields and other military installations such as fuel dumps, before withdrawing south to wage a guerrilla war. They did not have to wait very long, as on 21 January 1942, a preparatory bombing raid by about sixty Japanese aircraft attacked Kavieng. A number of aircraft were shot down, however, the company's only means of escape, the schooner Induna Star, was damaged. Nevertheless, despite the damage the crew managed to sail the vessel to Kaut where they started to repair the damage. As they did so, the commandos withdrew across the island to Sook, having received word that a large Japanese naval force was approaching the island.

In the early morning of 22 January 1942, the Japanese landed at Kavieng with between 3,000 and 4,000 troops. As the lead Japanese troops reached Kavieng airfield, fighting broke out as the small force that had remained at the airfield blew up the supply dump and other facilities. Fighting their way out, the commandos withdrew towards the main force at Sook, although a number of men were captured in the process. Once the company had regrouped at Sook, on 28 January they withdrew further south to Kaut, where they helped with the repair of the Induna Star, before setting out along the east coast of the island. They reached Kalili Harbour on 31 January but after learning that the fighting on New Britain was over and that the Japanese had occupied Rabaul, it was decided to sail for Port Moresby.

On 2 February the schooner was sighted by a Japanese plane which subsequently attacked, causing considerable damage to the vessel as well as destroying one of its lifeboats and causing a number of casualties. The Induna Star began taking on water and as a result the men were forced to surrender. Under escort by a Japanese aircraft and then later a destroyer, they were instructed to sail to Rabaul where they became prisoners of war.

After a few months at Rabaul, the officers were separated from their NCOs and men. The officers were transported to Japan where they remained in captivity for the rest of the war, whilst the NCOs and men, along with other members of Lark Force that had been captured and a number of civilians, where put on to the Japanese passenger ship Montevideo Maru for transportation. Traveling unescorted, the Montevideo Maru sailed from Rabaul on 22 June. On 1 July the ship was sighted by an American submarine, the USS Sturgeon, off the coast of the Luzon, Philippines. The USS Sturgeon torpedoed and sunk the Montevideo Maru, without realising it was a prisoner of war vessel. Only a handful of the Japanese crew were rescued, with none of the between 1,050 and 1,053 prisoners aboard surviving as they were still locked below deck. All 133 men from No. 1 Independent Company who were aboard the Montevideo Maru were either killed or drowned.

Meanwhile, the sections of the company that had not been with the main group at Kavieng managed to avoid capture by the Japanese. Working with the coastwatchers, they reported Japanese movements and carried out demolitions until they were later evacuated or escaped from the islands between April and May 1942. A reinforcement platoon had been trained in Australia while the company was deployed and after completing its training sailed on the Macdui, arriving at Port Moresby on 10 March 1942. Following their arrival, the platoon was designated the Independent Platoon Port Moresby and initially used for local defence purposes. It was later re-designated as Detachment 1 Independent Company. In April 1942, under the command of Captain Roy Howard, it was moved to Kudjeru, in New Guinea, to guard against possible Japanese movement south of Wau along the Bulldog Track. In the process they became the first Australian Army unit to cross the Owen Stanley Range. In June, a section fought alongside the 2/5th Independent Company as part of Kanga Force where they participated in a major raid on the Japanese at Salamaua. Eventually, however, as a result of the losses suffered during the 1942 campaigns it was decided that the company would be disbanded and as the survivors were transferred to other commando units – with the majority of those in Port Moresby being transferred to the 2/5th –No. 1 Independent Company was never raised again.

Throughout the course of the unit's existence, it suffered 142 men killed in action or died while prisoners of war. One member of the company was awarded the Military Cross.

Post-war have been many names such as the 1st Independent Company, 2/1st Independent Company or 2/1st Commando Squadron and these are all incorrect. All official records, less some personnel files of members, only refer to No.1 Independent Company. In personnel files this error is usually entered into the record will after the unit had disbanded and all other companies had been renamed to include the 2nd AIF identity of the prefix 2. The Unit War diary and official documents of the day only ever refer to No.1 Independent Company or 1 AIC (Australian Independent Company).

== Structure ==
With an authorised strength of 17 officers and 256 other ranks, No.1 Independent Company was composed of a company headquarters consisting of 13 personnel, three 60-man platoons named A, B and C, each of three 19-man sections numbered in series from 1 to 9, plus an engineer section of 21 men, a 34-man signals section, a medical section of six men and a transport section with four men. The company was commanded by a major, with a captain as a second-in-command. Each platoon was also commanded by a captain, while all sections except the medical and transport sections were commanded by lieutenants. The medical section was commanded by a captain.
