= MV Herstein =

History
- Name: Herstein
- Operator: Sigurd Herlofsen & Co. A/S, Oslo
- Port of registry: Oslo, Norway
- Builder: Burmeister & Wain, Copenhagen
- Yard number: 644
- Launched: 1 December 1938
- Identification: Call sign: LKGE
- Fate: Sunk by air raid, Rabaul, 20 January 1942

General characteristics
- Tonnage: 5,100 GRT
- Length: 424.7 ft (129.4 m)
- Beam: 56.7 ft (17.3 m)
- Depth: 26.3 ft (8.0 m)
- Decks: 2
- Installed power: 835 hp (623 kW)
- Propulsion: 2-stroke diesel 8-cylinder Burmeister & Wain engine
- Speed: 14 kn (26 km/h; 16 mph)

MV Herstein was a 5100 gross register ton freighter launched in 1938 at Copenhagen. She was involved in the unsuccessful search for survivors from HMAS Sydney in November 1941, and was destroyed at Rabaul in 1942.

During World War II Herstein transported freight and took part in a number of convoys. After carrying troops and equipment to Port Moresby, she proceeded to Rabaul to load copra, she was attacked by three dive bombers on 20 January 1942 with three bombs hitting amidships. One exploded in the engine room, resulting in a fire that quickly spread throughout the ship, and the second exploded in the bridge area. She was abandoned and she drifted afloat ablaze until becoming beached in Rabaul Harbour.

One crewman was killed as a result of the bombing. The rest of the crew were lost on the Montevideo Maru on 1 July 1942.
