= Kaut =

Kaut is a surname of German origin. Notable people with this surname include:

- Ellis Kaut (1920–2015), German author
- Helena Kaut-Howson, British theatre director
- Martin Kaut (born 1999), Czech ice hockey player

== See also ==
- KAUT-TV, television station licensed in Oklahoma, United States
