= Sione Lātūkefu =

Tongan academic and historian (1927–1995)

Sione Lātūkefu (10 April 1927 – 2 June 1995) was a Tongan academic and historian, and the author of several significant works on Tongan history.

Lātūkefu was born in Kolovai and educated at Tupou College and at Siaʻatoutai Theological College, before attending the University of Queensland, where he studied history and trained as a teacher. He then returned to Tonga to teach at Tupou College, but in 1962 returned to Australia to study at the Australian National University, graduating with a PhD in 1967. His thesis was on Church and state in Tonga : the influence of the Wesleyan Methodist missionaries on the political development of Tonga, 1826-1875.

After failing to find suitable employment in Tonga, he moved to Port Moresby in April 1967 to take up a role as lecturer in social disciplines at the newly-founded University of Papua New Guinea. He worked at the University of Papua New Guinea for 18 years before retiring to Canberra. In 1989, he founded the Tongan History Association to encourage studies of Tongan history. In 1988 he was appointed as principal of Pacific Theological College in Suva, Fiji, where he worked until 1991.

He died in Canberra, Australia on 2 June 1995.

== Bibliography ==
- Church and State in Tonga : The Wesleyan Methodist Missionaries and Political Development, 1822-1875, Australian National University Press, 1974, ISBN 0-7081-0402-9
- The Tongan Constitution: A brief history to celebrate its centenary, Tonga Traditions Committee Publication, 1975, ASIN B0000EDZOX
- Papua New Guinea: A Century of Colonial Impact, 1884-1984, University of Papua New Guinea, 1989, ISBN 9980-75-022-7
- "Tonga at Independence and Now", in Brij Lal & Hank Nelson (eds.), Lines Across the Sea: Colonial Inheritance in the Post Colonial Pacific, Brisbane: Pacific History Association, 1995, ISBN 0-646-24640-2; (posthum.)
- "Pacific Islander Missionaries", in Doug Munro & Andrew Thornley (eds.), The Covenant Makers: Islander Missionaries in the Pacific, 1996, ISBN 982-02-0126-8; (posthum.)
- "The Impact of the British on the Tongan Traditional Concept of Justice and Law", in Hermann J. Hiery & John M. MacKenzie (eds.), European Impact and Pacific Influence: British and German Colonial Policy in the Pacific Islands and the Indigenous Response, 1997, ISBN 1-86064-059-1; (posthum.)
