= Montevideo Maru =

Japanese ship sunk in World War II (1925–1942)

Coordinates: 18°37′N 119°29′E

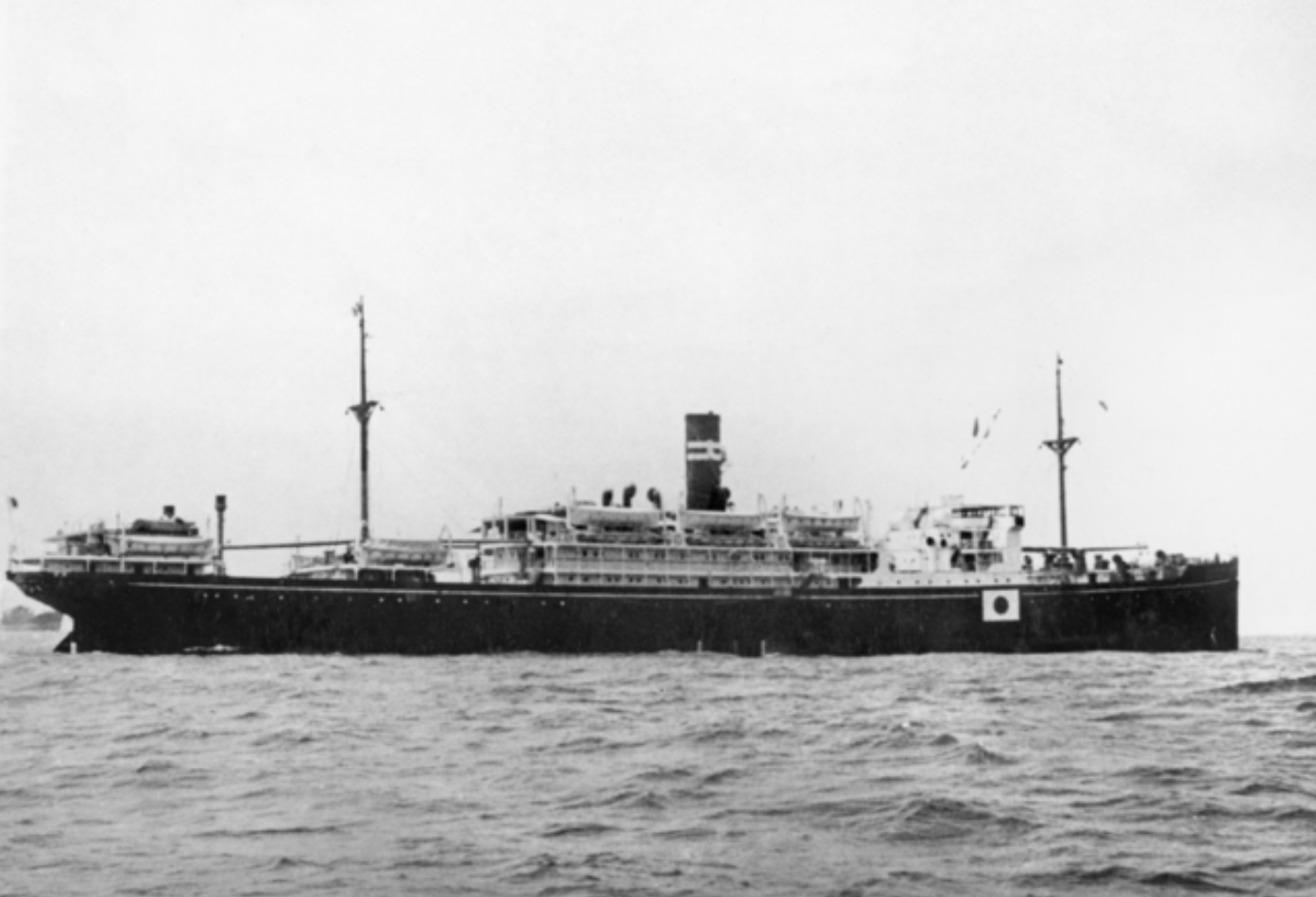
- Montevideo Maru, c. 1941

History

Japan
- Name: Montevideo Maru
- Namesake: Montevideo
- Owner: Osaka Shosen Kaisha (OSK)
- Port of registry: Osaka
- Builder: Mitsubishi Zosen Kakoki Kaisha, Nagasaki
- Yard number: 412
- Laid down: 9 September 1925
- Launched: 15 April 1926
- Completed: 14 August 1926
- Out of service: 1 July 1942
- Fate: Sunk, 1 July 1942

General characteristics
- Class & type: Santos Maru-class refrigerated passenger/cargo ship
- Tonnage: 7,267 GRT
- Length: 130 m (430 ft)
- Beam: 17 m (56 ft)
- Draught: 7.6 m (25 ft) loaded
- Propulsion: 2 × 1,700 kW (2,300 hp) Mitsubishi-Sulzer 6ST60 diesel engines; 2 screw propellers
- Speed: 14.5 knots (26.9 km/h)

Montevideo Maru (Japanese: もんてびでお丸) was a merchant ship of the Empire of Japan. Launched in 1926, it was pressed into service as a military transport during World War II. It was sunk by the American submarine USS Sturgeon on 1 July 1942, drowning 1,054 people, mostly Australian prisoners of war and civilians who were being transported from Rabaul, the former Australian territory of New Guinea, to Hainan. The sinking is considered the worst maritime disaster in Australia's history. The wreck of Montevideo Maru was discovered on 18 April 2023.

== Pre-war history ==
Montevideo Maru was one of three ships (along with Santos Maru and La Plata Maru) of the Osaka Shosen Kaisha (OSK) shipping line built for their trans-Pacific service to South America. The 7,267-gross register ton (GRT) ship was constructed at the Mitsubishi Zosen Kakoki Kaisha shipyard at Nagasaki, and launched in 1926. At 130 metres (430 feet) in length, and 17 m (56 ft) in the beam, it was powered by two Mitsubishi-Sulzer 6ST60 six-cylinder diesel engines delivering a total of 3,400 kilowatts (4,600 hp) and giving it a speed of 14.5 knots (26.9 km/h). Before the war, the ship operated as a passenger and cargo vessel, travelling mainly between Japan and Brazil carrying Japanese emigrants.

== World War II service ==
Montevideo Maru participated in the invasion of Makassar, Celebes, from 6 to 16 February, 1942. It completed several transport missions before being sunk.

=== Sinking ===
On 22 June 1942, approximately four months after the fall of Rabaul to the Japanese during January/February 1942, 1,054 prisoners (mostly Australians, 35 Norwegian and British sailors from MV Herstein and possibly some New Zealanders) were embarked from Rabaul's port onto Montevideo Maru. The ship was proceeding without escort to the Chinese island of Hainan, when it was sighted by the American submarine USS Sturgeon near the northern Philippine coast on 30 June 1942.

Sturgeon pursued but could not fire, as the target was travelling at 17 knots (31 km/h). Montevideo Maru slowed to about 12 knots (22 km/h) at midnight, to facilitate an expected rendezvous with an escort of two destroyers. Unaware that the ship was carrying Allied prisoners of war and civilians, Sturgeon fired four torpedoes at Montevideo Maru before dawn on 1 July 1942. At least one torpedo hit, causing the vessel to take on water and sink 11 minutes later. Australians in the water sang "Auld Lang Syne" to their trapped comrades as the ship sank beneath the waves.

There were more POWs in the water than crew members. The POWs were holding pieces of wood and using bigger pieces as rafts. They were in groups of 20 to 30 people, probably 100 people in all. They were singing songs. I was particularly impressed when they began singing Auld Lang Syne as a tribute to their dead colleagues. Watching that, I learnt that Australians have big hearts.

— Eyewitness Yoshiaki Yamaji, interviewed October 2003

The sinking is considered the worst maritime disaster in Australia's history. A nominal list made available by the Japanese government in 2012 revealed that a total of 1,054 prisoners (178 non-commissioned officers, 667 soldiers and 209 civilians) died on Montevideo Maru. Among the dead were 35 sailors from the Norwegian merchant ship Herstein. Based on a report made to OSK, of Montevideo Maru's complement of 88, some 17 crew and 3 guards are believed to have survived, though a total of 17 has also been claimed.

Among the missing prisoners were:

- Harold Page, deputy administrator of New Guinea and brother of Australian prime minister Earle Page
- Reverend Syd Beazley of the Methodist Mission, the uncle of future Australian Labor Party leader Kim Beazley
- Tom Vernon Garrett, the grandfather of Midnight Oil lead singer and government minister Peter Garrett
- Neill Ross Callaghan, the great-uncle of a shadow minister for defence, Andrew Hastie
- 22 Salvation Army bandsmen, the majority being members of the Brunswick Citadel band. The bandsmen had enlisted together and comprised the majority of the band of the 2/22nd Battalion.
- John Laurie Ramsay, brother of future Governor of Queensland James Ramsay

== Discovery of the wreck ==
In late January 2010, Federal Member of Parliament, Stuart Robert, called upon the then Prime Minister of Australia, Kevin Rudd, to back the search for Montevideo Maru, in the same way that he had supported the search for AHS Centaur.

On 18 April 2023, the wreck of Montevideo Maru was discovered at a depth of over 4,000 m (13,000 ft) in the South China Sea, off the northwest coast of Luzon, using technology from Dutch underwater search specialist Fugro. Australian prime minister Anthony Albanese said he hoped the news would bring a "measure of comfort to loved ones who have kept a long vigil". Silentworld Foundation director John Mullen said in a statement that the site would not be disturbed because it is a war grave.

== Memorials ==
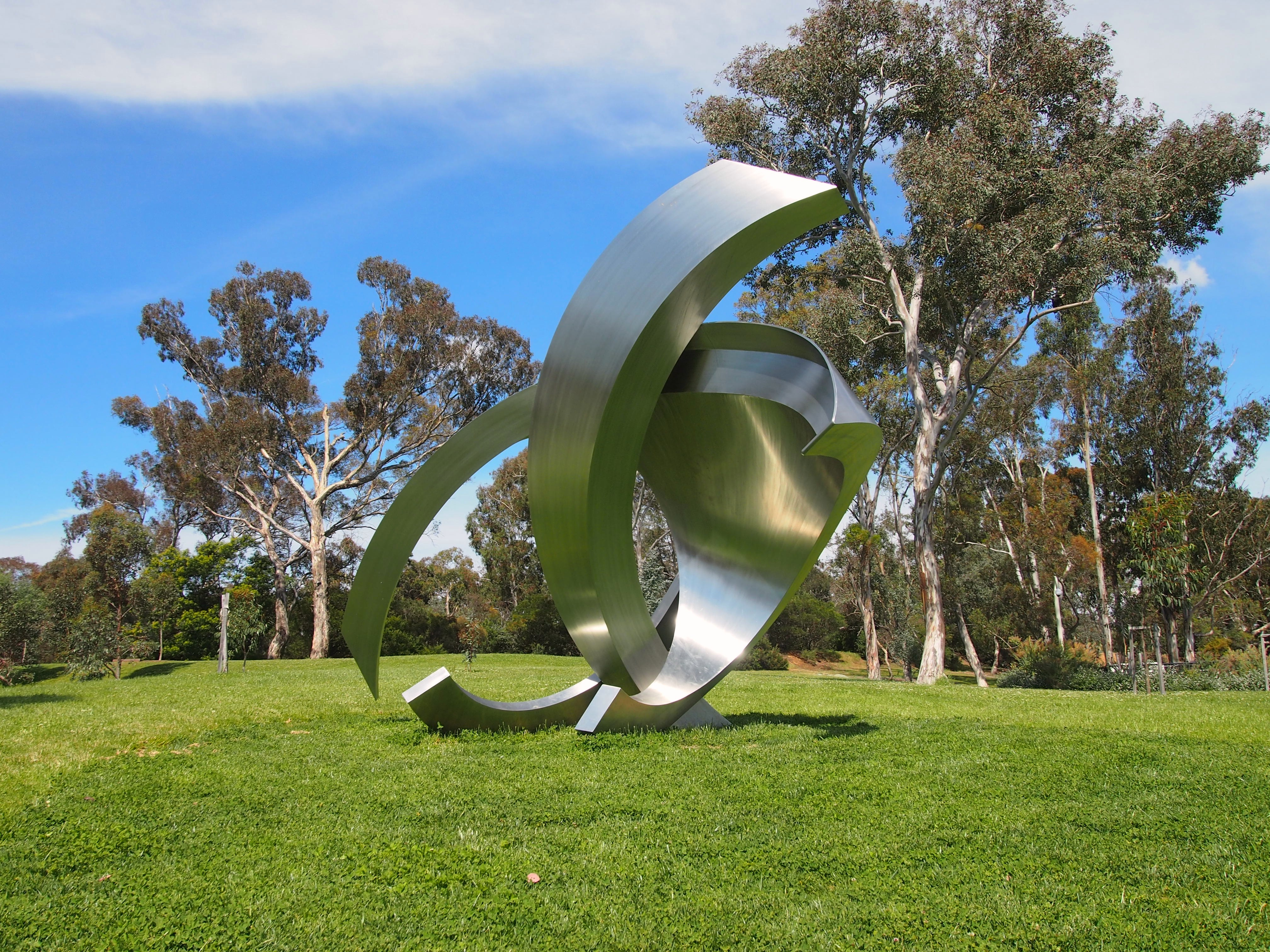
The memorial to the Australians killed in the defence of Rabaul and the sinking of the MV Montevideo Maru, on the eastern side of the Australian War Memorial in November 2012

A memorial to those who died was erected at the Repatriation Hospital, Bell Street, Heidelberg, Melbourne, Victoria. A Montevideo Maru memorial has been erected near the centre of the Australian Ex-Prisoners of War Memorial in Ballarat, Victoria. A commemoration service was held at the memorial unveiling in February 2004.

The song "In the Valley" from the album Earth and Sun and Moon by Australian pop-rock band Midnight Oil opens with the autobiographical line, "My grandfather went down with the Montevideo/The Rising Sun sent him floating to his rest", sung by Peter Garrett.

== Debated issues ==
=== Causes of deaths ===
Australian veteran Albert Speer (no relation to the wartime German official, Albert Speer) argued in an interview that some of the Australians survived, only for them to die later. Speer, who served in New Guinea, claimed that survivors were transported to Sado Island, only to die days before the dropping of atomic bombs on Japan, in August 1945. Professor Hank Nelson considers it unlikely that any Japanese ship would have stopped to rescue prisoners with a hostile submarine nearby. Of the known Japanese survivors, the only one ever questioned was former merchant seaman Yoshiaki Yamaji. In a 2003 interview with The 7.30 Report, he stated that he was told that some of the POWs had been picked up and taken to Kobe.

The Rabaul garrison has been described as a "sacrificial lamb" by David Day. Lark Force was left without reinforcements, and instructed not to withdraw, in accordance with official War Cabinet policy at the time regarding small garrisons. Harold Page, the senior government official in the territory, was instructed to evacuate only "unnecessary" civilians and was refused permission to evacuate any administrative staff. He was listed among those lost on the Montevideo Maru.

=== Number of casualties ===
It has been difficult to determine a definitive number of the dead. As late as 2010, Australia's Minister for Defence Personnel, Alan Griffin, stated that "there is no absolutely confirmed roll". Australian Army officer Major Harold S. Williams' 1945 list of the Australian dead was lost, along with the original Japanese list in katakana it had been compiled from; these challenges have been exacerbated by the forensic difficulties of recovering remains lost at sea.

In 2012, the Japanese government handed over thousands of POW documents to the Australian government. The Montevideo Maru's manifest, which contained the names of all the Australians on board, was among them. The translation of the manifest was released in June 2012, confirming a total of 1,054 Australians, of whom 845 were from Lark Force. The new translation corrected a longstanding historical error in the number of civilians who went down with the ship. There were 209, not 208 as previously thought. This is not an additional casualty. Rather, the previous number was simply inaccurate.

== See also ==
- List of ships sunk by submarines by death toll
- List of Japanese hell ships
