= Papuan Infantry Battalion =

WWII Australian infantry unit

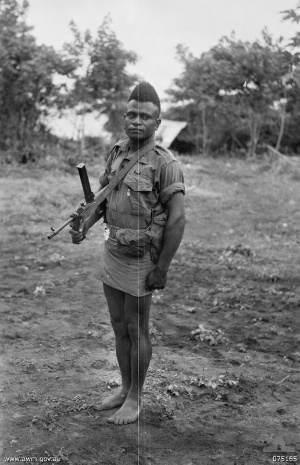
- Sergeant Bengari of A Company, PIB on 5 August 1944
- Active: 1940–1946
- Country: Australia
- Branch: Australian Army
- Type: Infantry
- Role: Reconnaissance
- Size: One battalion ~300–700 men
- Part of: 8th Military District; New Guinea Force
- Garrison/HQ: Port Moresby
- Nickname: "Green Shadows"
- Colours: Red and green
- Engagements: Second World War: New Guinea campaign
- Battle honours: South West Pacific 1942–45, Kokoda Trail, Kokoda-Deniki, Nassau Bay, Tambu Bay, Finschhafen, Scarlet Beach, Liberation of Australian New Guinea, Sio-Sepik River, Kaboibus-Kiarivu and Bonis-Porton

Commanders
- Notable commanders: William Watson

Insignia
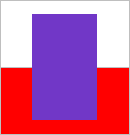
- Unit colour patch

The Papuan Infantry Battalion (PIB) was a unit of the Australian Army raised in the Territory of Papua for service during the Second World War. Formed in early 1940 in Port Moresby to help defend the territory in the event of a Japanese invasion, its soldiers were primarily Papuan natives led by Australian officers and non-commissioned officers. Following the outbreak of the Pacific War, the PIB served in many of the Allied campaigns in New Guinea; however, due to the nature of its role its sub-units mainly operated separately, attached to larger Australian and US Army units and formations. Slow in forming, the first members of the PIB were not officially posted in until March 1941. By 1942 it consisted of only three companies, all of which were under-strength and poorly equipped. It was subsequently employed on scouting, reconnaissance and surveillance patrols against the Japanese, where the natural bushcraft of its native soldiers could be used to their advantage. The PIB was sent forward in June 1942 to patrol the northern coast of Papua and was dispersed over a wide area. These small parties were the first to make contact with the Imperial Japanese forces upon their landing in Papua, before participating in the Kokoda Track campaign. As part of Maroubra Force, the PIB fought alongside the Australian 39th Battalion at Kokoda, Deniki, and Isurava as the Japanese forced them back along the Kokoda track, but was withdrawn before the campaign finally turned in favour of the Australians.

Following the recapture of the northern beachheads of Buna, Gona and Sanananda, the Allies moved onto the offensive in New Guinea. The PIB took part in the advance to Salamaua in 1943, before fighting along the Markham, Ramu, and Sepik rivers during the Ramu Valley – Finisterre Range campaign, and on the Huon peninsula, assisting in the capture of Finschhafen and Sattelberg, and pursuing the Japanese as they retreated along the northern coastline towards Saidor in 1943–1944. The battalion was temporarily withdrawn from operations to reorganise in 1944, and together with several New Guinea Infantry Battalions (NGIBs) that were subsequently raised by the Australian Army, the PIB was formed into the Pacific Islands Regiment (PIR) in November 1944. In 1945, it was deployed to Bougainville where the battalion's companies were spread across the fronts from Bonis to Buin during the final months of the war. Such was their effectiveness that the Japanese referred to the PIB as "Green Shadows" due to their ability to fade into and appear from the jungle unexpectedly, with its soldiers becoming noted for their ferocity and tenacity. After the end of the war the battalion was used to guard Japanese prisoners of war, before being disbanded in August 1946. In 1951, the PIR was reformed, drawing its lineage from the PIB and NGIBs.

== History ==
=== Formation ===
Following the outbreak of the Second World War in Europe on 3 September 1939, limited defensive preparations began in the Australian administered territories of Papua and New Guinea. In Papua, the raising of an all-volunteer unit of native soldiers led by Australian officers and non-commissioned officers (NCOs), known as the Papuan Infantry Battalion (PIB), was approved by the Lieutenant-Governor of Papua, Sir Hubert Murray, on 19 April 1940. This was in contrast to the situation in New Guinea where the provisions of the League of Nations mandate under which German New Guinea had been entrusted to Australia in 1920 following its capture during the First World War had prevented the raising of armed forces there prior to hostilities. Meanwhile, the paternalistic concerns of the civilian administration regarding native welfare and unease about providing the indigenous population with arms and military training meant they were not enlisted into the New Guinea Volunteer Rifles (NGVR) which was also forming at that time, with recruiting for the NGVR limited to Europeans only. (Note: Granted under Article 22 of the Covenant of the League of Nations, the mandate imposed restrictions on the establishment of military and naval bases, fortifications, and the military training of local inhabitants for purposes other than the maintenance of law and order.) (Note: Ultimately such measures were not extended to the mandated territory of New Guinea until 1944 after which natives were recruited for service in the 1st, 2nd, 3rd and 4th New Guinea Infantry Battalions.)

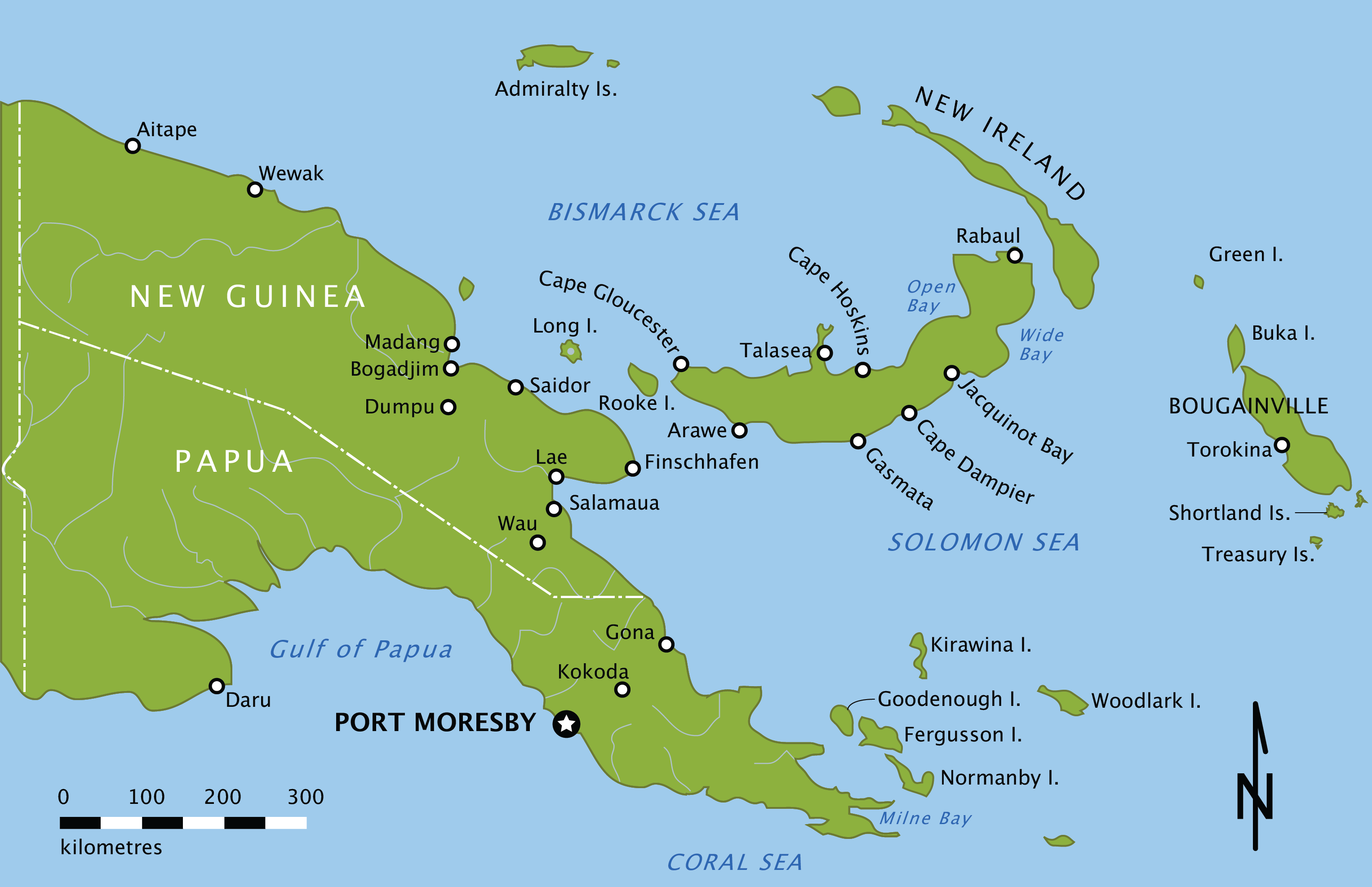
The territories of Papua and New Guinea

Major Leonard Logan was appointed as commanding officer of the PIB on 27 May 1940 and it began forming at Port Moresby on 1 June. The unit's establishment was initially limited to one company of six officers and 137 men, although it was planned to increase to 252 men in 1941, and 294 in 1942. Logan had previously been the Headquarters Officer of the Royal Papuan Constabulary (RPC), while the battalion second-in-command and officer commanding A Company was Major William Watson, a miner and former artillery officer in the First Australian Imperial Force (AIF) who had lived in New Guinea for many years. Enlistments in the PIB began in June 1940, with the first 63 recruits being current or former members of the RPC, a connection which allowed the unit to claim a lineage to the Armed Native Constabulary, which had been formed in the late 19th-century to police the Protectorate of British New Guinea. Police Motu was adopted as the common language of the battalion. (Note: This was in contrast to the Pacific Islands Regiment which later used Pidgin English, although most soldiers reverted to their tribal language when under pressure.) Rates of pay were equivalent to those of the constabulary, while service was for two years. Logan flew to Kokoda on 6 June to collect the first enlistments, and walked back to Port Moresby, arriving on 1 July.

Three warrant officers from the Australian Instructional Corps (AIC) were temporarily posted to the battalion to fill the vacant company sergeant major and platoon commander positions. Meanwhile, after finalising the initial recruitment process and the issue of equipment at Konedobu, near Hanuabada village, 4.8 kilometres (3.0 mi) from Port Moresby, the battalion was allocated a camp at the future site of Murray Barracks in Port Moresby, and began weapons training in late August 1940. Following three months of basic training the PIB took over responsibility for guarding key points around Port Moresby from the RPC, including the oil storage facilities, wireless station, military headquarters, power station and the telephone exchange, while also assisting in road construction and undertaking further training. Despite the worsening strategic situation as the war continued overseas, the pattern of life in Papua continued relatively unchanged from that of the pre-war years. Slow in forming, the first members of the PIB were not officially posted in until March 1941. At this time contingency plans for the defence of Papua and New Guinea envisioned the deployment of Australian forces to Rabaul and Port Moresby, while the defence of Lae and Salamaua would be left to the NGVR.

=== Initial preparations ===
As the war with Germany and Italy continued in Europe, North Africa and the Middle East, Australian fears of Japanese intentions in the Pacific grew. However, with the bulk of Australian military and naval forces in the Middle East, defensive preparations remained limited. Two brigades from the 8th Division were dispatched to Singapore and then Malaya in February 1941, while a Militia battalion would be stationed between Port Moresby and Thursday Island. Additionally, plans were made for an AIF battalion to garrison Rabaul on New Britain, and the 8th Division's third brigade—less the battalion at Rabaul—was to be dispersed piecemeal in Timor and Ambon. In July 1941, the 1st Independent Company was deployed to Kavieng on New Ireland to protect the airfield, while sections were sent to Namatanai in central New Ireland, Vila in the New Hebrides, Tulagi on Guadalcanal, Buka Passage in Bougainville, and Lorengau on Manus Island to act as observers. The 2/22nd Battalion began arriving in Rabaul in March and April 1941, while additional units were added to the force. Designated Lark Force, it tasks included protecting the airfields at Lakunai and Vunakanau and the seaplane base in Simpson Harbour, as well as forming an "advanced observation line" to provide early warning of Japanese movements. The position was increasingly viewed as untenable, but the garrison was reinforced with four Lockheed Hudson bombers and ten obsolete CAC Wirraway reconnaissance aircraft from No. 24 Squadron RAAF, and by December it had grown to 1,400 men.

The planned expansion of the PIB proceeded as scheduled, with the second and third companies forming in 1941. In May, the establishment of the battalion had been increased, and in April Logan requested another 100 men from the government. B Company was formed from a nucleus of 62 recruits which arrived from Buna on 12 May under the command of Captain Ernest Standfield, a former planter. While the chief argument for the formation of the battalion had been the value of the knowledge native soldiers would provide of local conditions, with the expansion of the unit many of the officers and NCOs posted into it were from Australian infantry, engineer and artillery units based in Port Moresby, rather than local expatriates. Indeed, with the main role of the unit envisioned to be scouting and reconnaissance—tasks in which it was felt the natural bushcraft of the natives could be utilised to their greatest potential—the drawbacks of junior leaders without local experience was apparent. The terms of service of the new recruits included enlistment for three years, with pay at a rate of 10 shillings per month for the first year, 15 in the second, and one pound in the third, with lance corporals paid 25 shillings, corporals 30 shillings, and sergeants 40 shillings. Equipment provided included a waterproof cape, clasp knife and lanyard, two pairs of khaki shorts and shirts per year, two green sashes, sulus for working and sleeping, in addition to a mosquito net, blankets, plates and eating utensils, webbing, rifle, bayonet, and helmet. Rations were more generous than those given to the police, and included butter and jam.

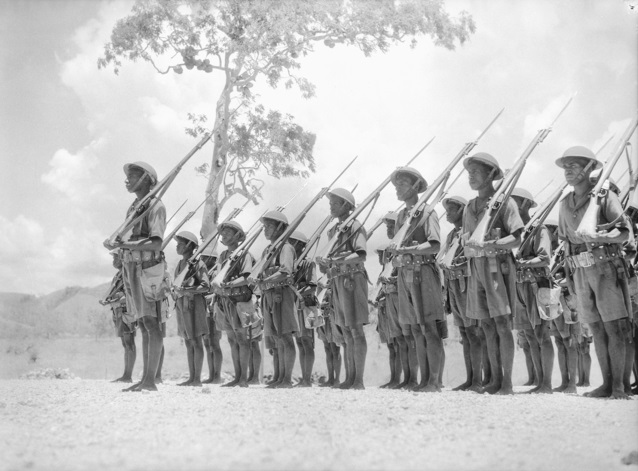
Members of the Papuan Infantry Battalion at Port Moresby, January 1941

The battalion would ultimately serve in many of the Allied campaigns in New Guinea; however, due to the nature of its role its sub-units would mainly operate separately, attached to larger Australian and US units and formations. As such, unlike the headquarters of standard Australian battalions, the PIB's headquarters was primarily employed as an administration and training company, and saw little action. One of the commanding officer's primary roles was to ensure members of the battalion were appropriately utilised and recognised for their service, and in this role regularly liaised with the Australian New Guinea Administrative Unit (ANGAU) and New Guinea Force. Headquarters Company also included the battalion Q Store. In addition to holding the usual equipment required of any Australian unit, due to the unique makeup of the PIB it had the added challenge of obtaining specific food and clothing required by native soldiers. The Signals Section was responsible for maintaining communications within the battalion and with other units in the Port Moresby area by field telephone, with Papuans and New Guineans attached to the section being taught all aspects of the maintenance and operation of the switchboard and line equipment. Although the War Establishment provided for a Regimental Medical Officer and medical orderlies (all Europeans), no permanent medical staff were posted to the unit until June 1943. Prior to this, orderlies were supplied by ANGAU on attachment, although there were occasions during subsequent operations when the men were without medical support, or were supported by medics from the US Army.

Until August 1941 the PIB continued to be used guarding vulnerable points, constructing roads and working on the wharves, while further training also occurred during this time. However, in September the unit was allocated the task of defending the area from Napa Napa to Jolers Bay. Following a reconnaissance, A and B Companies moved into their allocated areas and began constructing roads for tactical movement and defensive positions. Although required to continue to provide guards at key installations, a period of intensive training followed. In August Logan sought an additional 107 recruits to continue the expansion of the battalion, with C Company being formed in November 1941. Meanwhile, Lieutenant Alan Hooper took over as officer commanding B Company, after Standfield and a number of other officers from the battalion, including Watson, were detached to various headquarters and units based in New Guinea. Watson was seconded to Base Headquarters as civilian recruiting officer, while Standfield was detailed to work on the supply line road from Bulldog to Wau, as defensive preparations continued. On 1 December, A Company was withdrawn from defence work and tasked with unloading cargo from shipping at the wharf in Port Moresby.

=== Outbreak of war in the Pacific ===
The Japanese began aerial reconnaissance over Rabaul soon after the attack on Pearl Harbor on 7 December 1941, and the compulsory evacuation of all remaining European women and children to Australia was ordered on 12 December. Following the surprise attack on the US fleet A Company, PIB was relieved of its duties unloading ships at the wharf to man defensive positions and mount a 24-hour watch. Meanwhile, scattered across the islands to the north, the 270 men of the 1st Independent Company were all that lay between Rabaul and the large Japanese base at Truk in the Caroline Islands. Australian defences in Papua remained limited and were centred on Port Moresby, consisting of approximately 1,000 only partially trained Militia from the 49th Battalion, two six-inch coastal guns, a 3.7-inch anti-aircraft battery and a few Consolidated PBY Catalina flying boats, in addition to the locally recruited PIB which was still forming, and the part-time volunteer NGVR. These forces came under the operational command of the 8th Military District commanded by Major General Basil Morris. However, with the Japanese soon expected to attempt to seize Rabaul and Port Moresby the remainder of the 30th Brigade was brought forward, with the 39th and 53rd Battalions arriving in Port Moresby on 3 January. These units gradually took over the PIB's defensive duties, with the battalion being used in a pioneer role. Morris subsequently planned to spread the NGVR and PIB widely as part of a reconnaissance screen.

The first air attacks on Rabaul began on 4 January 1942. Within days the Japanese had succeeded in destroying the bulk of the defending aircraft, while further attacks targeted shipping in the harbour and shore installations. Lieutenant Colonel John Scanlan considered he would need an entire brigade to defend Rabaul, yet with an invasion imminent all he could do was redeploy some of his limited force, while the remaining aircraft were withdrawn and the airfields cratered. The Japanese South Seas Force of approximately 5,300 men under the command of Major General Tomitarō Horii landed at Rabaul in the early hours of 23 January 1942. Outnumbered, Lark Force was quickly overrun in the ensuing fighting, with the Japanese completing the capture of the town within 24 hours. Australian losses were heavy, with 28 men killed and most of the defenders captured. The survivors withdrew into the interior, moving south across New Britain to the Open Bay and Wide Bay areas, and west, for eventual evacuation. In total more than 400 servicemen and civilians escaped. Many were less fortunate. A total of 160 wounded and sick Australian soldiers were captured and subsequently murdered by the Japanese at Tol Plantation. Later, the Japanese naval prison ship Montevideo Maru was sunk off the west coast of Luzon in the South China Sea on 1 July 1942 after she was torpedoed by the submarine USS Sturgeon, resulting in the loss of 1,035 lives, most of them Australian civilians and prisoners of war from Rabaul.

=== Japanese landings, March 1942 ===
By 1942, the PIB consisted of only three understrength and poorly equipped companies. Total manning included approximately 300 indigenous Papuans. In late January, the PIB had moved from Hanuabada to the 9-Mile area, and were tasked with supplying rock from the quarry for airfield development and the construction of dispersal bays at 7-Mile Airstrip. The PIB subsequently conducted a number of small patrols from Redscar Bay to Rigo, and inland to the foot of the Owen Stanley Range, which served as an occasional relief from heavy labouring. These patrols consisted of a number of small reconnaissance parties which had been dispatched to Obu near Yule Island in the Gulf of Papua, as well as to Hisiu on the west coast, Rigo, and the Owen Stanley Range. These parties were detailed to be alert for possible infiltration by Japanese paratroops as well as to rescue downed Allied aircrew. Port Moresby was bombed by Japanese aircraft at 03:00 on the morning of 3 February, the first of many heavy air raids. Allied air defences were almost non-existent, and the raids significantly reduced civilian morale, while several PIB recruits deserted. Following the bombing of Port Moresby, in early February the civil administration in Papua was replaced by military control. ANGAU was formed to administer both Papua and New Guinea in a unified military government, following their hurried amalgamation.

Watson was recalled soon after hostilities commenced, succeeding Logan as commanding officer of the PIB on 16 February after the later was evacuated from Papua due to illness and was forced to retire. The PIB was subsequently employed in scouting, reconnaissance and surveillance patrols against the Japanese. On 19 February, a platoon from A Company under the command of Lieutenant Harold Jesser was ordered by Morris to patrol the north coast of Papua between Buna and the Waria River, while other platoons would screen possible avenues of approach to Port Moresby, with a second patrol from A Company departing for Rigo on 20 February, and a third a week later. On 8 March 1942, approximately 3,000 Japanese naval troops landed unopposed at Lae forcing the NGVR detachment there to withdraw west towards Nadzab, while another battalion from the Japanese South Sea's Force landed further south at Salamaua the same day. After observing the landings another NGVR detachment skirmished with the Japanese and attempted to demolish the airfield before withdrawing across the Francisco River, destroying the bridge across the river mouth as they went. The Japanese then occupied Salamaua and, after leaving a section at the river, the men of the NGVR moved south to Mubo.

The Japanese were now within 160 kilometres (100 mi) of Port Moresby but were required to pause to consolidate their gains, allowing the Allies time to reinforce Australia. Being the only Allied force in the area until the arrival of Kanga Force at Wau in May, the NGVR subsequently monitored the Japanese bases which had been established in the Huon Gulf region, establishing observation posts overlooking the main approaches and reporting on Japanese movements. Meanwhile, elements of the US Fifth Air Force began arriving in Port Moresby, commencing bombing operations against Japanese positions at Lae, Salamaua and Rabaul, with the PIB tasked with search and rescue for downed airmen. On 11 March, Jesser and Corporal Kimani with a section of PIB were at Buna, having marched all night from Kokoda in response to advice that a Japanese landing was expected at Buna that day. They were in time to observe a Japanese seaplane fire on a launch belonging to the Anglican mission and a group of civilians, including the local bishop (Bishop Strong). The seaplane landed 275 metres (300 yd) out to sea near Buna. Jesser and Kimani engaged the aircraft with rifles, driving it off. On 21 March, the beleaguered garrison at Port Moresby was strengthened by the arrival of Kittyhawk fighters from No. 75 Squadron RAAF. Throughout March, April and May the PIB continued patrolling, while men not involved in these operations were employed at the quarry and the aerodrome in Port Moresby. No contact was made with the Japanese during this period.

=== Buna to Kokoda, June 1942 – January 1943 ===
Following their defeat during the Battle of the Coral Sea in early May the Japanese invasion fleet bound for Port Moresby had been forced to turn back, while on 4 June the Japanese were decisively beaten at Midway by the US Navy. Despite these setbacks though Japanese forces in Rabaul and Lae appeared to be preparing an attack against Port Moresby from northern Papua, via Buna and Kokoda. During this time the only Allied unit in the South West Pacific Area still actively engaging the Japanese was Kanga Force, made up of the NGVR and the 1st and 2/5th Independent Companies, fighting a guerrilla campaign against the Japanese around Lae and Salamaua. In June 1942 Morris tasked the PIB with reconnoitring the Awala–Tufi–Ioma area. To meet the Japanese threat the Allies planned to construct airstrips in the Buna–Dobodura area to facilitate operations against Rabaul and to secure it in order to forestall any advance from that direction. As the situation worsened, the PIB—with a strength of just 30 officers and 280 men—was sent forward to patrol the northern coast of Papua and was subsequently dispersed over a wide area. Along with the 39th Battalion (less one company), and supply and medical detachments, they formed part Maroubra Force.

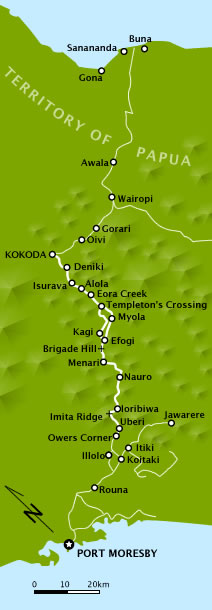
A map depicting locations along the Kokoda Track

Under the command of Lieutenant Colonel William Owen, the commanding officer of the 39th Battalion, Maroubra Force was tasked with delaying a Japanese advance from Awala to Kokoda, preventing movement towards Port Moresby through a gap in the Owen Stanley Range near Kokoda, and resisting any airborne landings in the area. (Note: In reality the "gap" was a misnomer, being little more than a broad dip in the Owen Stanleys.) A platoon from B Company, PIB under Lieutenant Arthur Smith departed Port Moresby on 7 June to patrol the Barena–Buna area, with the remainder of the company following on 14 June under the command of Hooper, tasked with patrolling the Ioma, Mambare, Morobe, Waria River, and Garaina areas. A platoon from A Company under Lieutenant John Izatt was already in position at Waria River and was attached to B Company. On 24 June the battalion headquarters under Watson and C Company moved forward from Port Moresby to the Kokoda–Awala area. Meanwhile, B Company, 39th Battalion was sent overland via the Kokoda Track to secure the Buna area and prepare to oppose any Japanese advance, while the PIB was already north of the Owen Stanley Range at the entrance of the Kokoda Track. Maroubra Force arrived at Kokoda on 15 July. Yet despite initial Allied patrols and engineer reconnaissance into the area, the Japanese had ultimately been able to move faster, seizing the initiative. As a result, these small parties would ultimately be the first to make contact with the Imperial Japanese forces upon their landing in Papua.

Having already captured much of the northern part of New Guinea in early 1942, the Japanese landed on the north-east coast of Papua, establishing beachheads at Buna, Gona and Sanananda. On the night of 21/22 July, 3,000 Japanese landed near Gona in an attempt to advance south overland through the mountains of the Owen Stanley Range to seize Port Moresby as part of a strategy of isolating Australia from the United States. Initially only limited Australian forces were available to oppose them, and after making rapid progress, the Japanese South Seas Force under Horii clashed with understrength Australian forces at Awala on 23 July, before forcing them back to Kokoda. During the PIB's first engagement Lieutenant John Chalk's platoon had participated in an ambush of the Japanese troops advancing towards Kokoda. Chalk and a scout party had moved to Sangara on the night of 22 July where they observed a Japanese force camped. The next morning he reported their arrival by runner and was ordered by Watson to engage them. That night, Chalk and his 40-man platoon ambushed Japanese forces from a hill overlooking the Gona–Sangara road, killing several before withdrawing into the jungle as they quickly responded with small arms and mortar fire. (Note: The action at Awala later assumed significance for Papuan New Guineans. Until 1981 PNG had commemorated its war dead on Anzac Day; however, since then Remembrance Day has been observed on 23 July.) Meanwhile, elements of B Company, 39th Battalion under Captain Sam Templeton had begun arriving and they moved to cover the Papuan withdrawal. In the confusion some PIB soldiers at Awala deserted, although a few withdrew with the Australians. (Note: According to Collie and Marutani the Papuans had been "...pressed into joining the military by an authoritarian administration. They had little heart for it. The war with Japan, after all, was Australia's business. The Japanese were just another group of strangers intruding in their country.")

Watson then withdrew with his headquarters from Awala to Ongahambo, but was soon forced to fall back to Wairope. Meanwhile, Jesser's party on the northern flank was in danger of being cut-off. Slashing their way through the bush to Wairope, the following morning they found that Watson had ordered the wire footbridge destroyed and were forced to swim across the Kumusi River to escape. Watson then retired to Gorari, nearer to Kokoda while the bulk of the PIB and B Company, 39th Battalion remained on the west bank. The PIB was then joined by a platoon under Templeton, ambushing the Japanese the following day as they crossed the Kumusi in rubber boats. Forced to withdraw, the Japanese moved further along the river before crossing in an attempt to encircle them. Attacking the Australians and Papuans with mortars and heavy machine-guns, many PIB soldiers again withdrew into the bush. Some eventually met up with the main party and others moved back to Kokoda, yet many deserted. Elements of the PIB and B Company, 39th Battalion again clashed with the Japanese at Gorari on 25 July, killing or wounding 15. Yet reduced to only a few Australian officers and NCOs and a handful of Papuans, the force withdrew to Oivi with the 39th Battalion after losing six men missing. Concerned by the state of his men and with no Australian troops between Kokoda and C Company, 39th Battalion (which departed Illolo on the 23rd and was still moving up the track), Owen requested reinforcements be flown in. Hoping to halt the advance, the Australians and Papuans dug in at Oivi on the night of 26/27 July, yet the Japanese proved too strong and once again the defenders were driven back. Templeton was killed and Watson took command, withdrawing through Deniki on 27 July.

At Deniki they joined up with the remainder of B Company, 39th Battalion now personally commanded by Owen who had come forward to take over. Moving back to Kokoda, they were also rejoined by a number of the men that had been cut-off at Oivi. Owen decided to attempt a defence of the Kokoda airstrip in the hope reinforcements would arrive in time to support him. Leaving around 40 troops at Deniki, he took the remaining 77 men and was deployed around Kokoda by midday on 28 July. Maroubra Force engaged the Japanese in the first unsuccessful defence of the Kokoda airstrip on the night of 28/29 July 1942. At 02:00 on 29 July the Japanese commenced a mortar barrage, supported by machine-gun fire, before charging up the steep slope at the northern end of the position. Owen was killed and Watson again took temporary command, leading a fighting withdrawal towards the village of Deniki, 1 mile (1.6 km) back along the Kokoda Track towards Isurava. For his bravery and leadership, Watson was later awarded the Distinguished Service Order. Australian losses at Kokoda had consisted of two killed and seven or eight wounded; however, many more had become cut-off during the fighting and were missing. Meanwhile, Smith reported that the Japanese had landed at the mouth of the Kumusi River, while Izatt stated on 1 August that he had been forced to withdraw from Ioma after destroying the government station there. Running low on food he attempted to contact B Company, PIB under Hooper, operating in the Waria-Opi River area. PIB patrols operating in the Iomai–Warioa–Ambasi area were ordered by Watson to remain in location and attempt to maintain contact with the Japanese.

The loss of the airstrip at Kokoda forced the Australians to send the other two companies of the 39th Battalion, and the remaining battalions of the 30th Brigade—the 49th and 53rd Battalions—overland, rather than reinforcing by air. (Note: The involvement of the 49th Battalion in the campaign ultimately proved limited. After attempts to fly-in elements of the battalion to Kokoda proved abortive, they conducted long-range patrols along the Goldie River as part of Honner Force, and established standing patrols between the Goldie and Laloki Rivers.) Meanwhile, the wounded would now have to be carried out by native porters and supplies air dropped. Major Allan Cameron—brigade major of the 30th Brigade—temporarily took command of Maroubra Force on 4 August and was ordered to recapture Kokoda. By the first week in August reinforcements had arrived in Deniki, including both A and C Company, 39th Battalion, while further forces were moving up the Kokoda Track. The Australian force now consisted of 31 officers and 443 other ranks of the 39th Battalion; eight Australians and 35 native troops of the PIB; and two officers and 12 native members of ANGAU; a total of 533 men. Although poorly equipped and short on supplies, Cameron planned to attack an estimated Japanese force of 300 to 400 men at Kokoda. The Australians attempted to retake Kokoda on 8 August, but with both sides suffering heavy casualties, the 39th Battalion and PIB fell back to Deniki. Although they beat off a number of Japanese attacks over the following week, on 14 August they were forced to commence withdrawing over the Owen Stanley Range to Isurava.

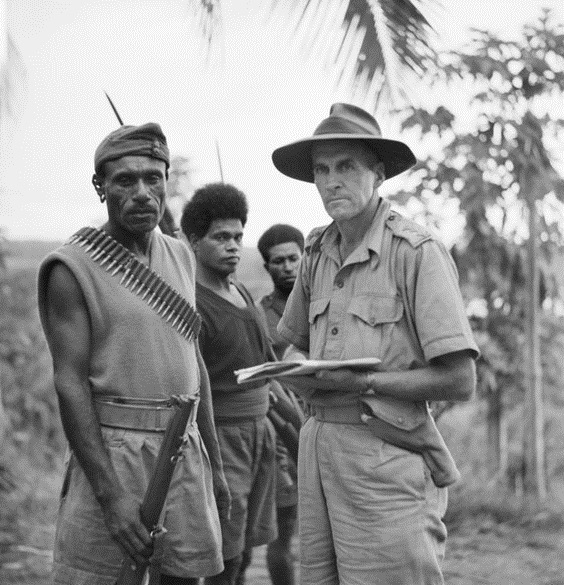
Members of the PIB and Royal Papuan Constabulary being briefed before a patrol around Waiwai, south of Buna, in October 1942

At the height of the fighting Lieutenant General Sydney Rowell's I Corps headquarters arrived at Port Moresby, and he assumed command of New Guinea Force from Morris on 12 August 1942. Blamey subsequently ordered Major General Arthur Allen's veteran Australian 7th Division—recently returned from fighting in the Middle East—to embark for New Guinea. The 18th Brigade was ordered to Milne Bay while the 21st and 25th Brigades would go to Port Moresby. The Japanese continued to commit men and supplies to the fighting along the Kokoda Track, with 13,500 men landed at Gona and Buna by August. Yet the Japanese did not press the Australians following their withdrawal from Deniki, and during the next 10 days the 39th Battalion and PIB were reinforced by the 53rd Battalion and the headquarters of the 30th Brigade under the command of Brigadier Selwyn Porter. By the 23 August the 21st Brigade had also arrived at Isurava, under the command of Brigadier Arnold Potts. These reinforcements proved pivotal in temporarily halting Japanese progress, but the Australians increasingly faced a major supply problem and the 39th Battalion was withdrawn to reduce the logistic burden.

On the evening of 25 August 1942, the Japanese staged a landing at Milne Bay, on the eastern tip of New Guinea, to reduce the Allied airfields that had been established there. Despite initial success, the force was subsequently destroyed by the Australians with the survivors forced to evacuate by sea on 4–5 September. Meanwhile, during this time Horii's South Seas Detachment had continued to make strong progress along the Kokoda Track. After the Japanese resumed their advance on 26 August the Australians mounted a series of delaying actions before falling back to Eora Creek on 30 August, Templeton's Crossing on 2 September, and Efogi three days later. Although the outnumbered Australian opposition was becoming increasingly effective and the Japanese were beginning to experience the strain of an over extended supply line, the defenders were increasingly exhausted and reduced by disease and sickness as a result of their exertions and the harsh terrain. Potts handed over command to Porter on 10 September, who subsequently withdrew to Ioribaiwa, checking a Japanese attack there the following day. With the brigades of Allen's 7th Division now reinforcing Maroubra Force, the PIB was organised into teams of stretcher bearers and was assigned the task of evacuating sick and wounded Australian soldiers back along the Kokoda Track. On 14 September command of the forward areas was taken over by Brigadier Kenneth Eather.

Heavy fighting continued around Ioribaiwa for the following week, before the Australians were again forced back, this time to Imita Ridge. By 17 September the Japanese were almost in sight of Port Moresby itself. However, following a heavy defeat at Guadalcanal, Horii was ordered onto the defensive and this proved to be the limit of the Japanese advance. By mid-September the PIB was withdrawn from the front, and moved back to Sogeri near Port Moresby for respite and to re-equip. A small detachment of two Australian sergeants and six Papuans remained at Uberi Village at the southern end of the Kokoda Track, from where they carried out patrols under the command of the 25th Brigade. The Japanese began to withdraw from Kokoda on 24 September to establish a defensive position on the north coast, but were closely followed by the Australians who recaptured Kokoda on 2 November. Further fighting continued into November and December as Australian and US forces assaulted the Japanese beachheads, in what later became known as the Battle of Buna–Gona. After some of the costliest fighting of the war for the Australians, Gona was recaptured on 9 December 1942, and Buna on 3 January 1943. The Japanese began to abandon Sanananda on 13 January following an unsuccessful Australian assault the day before, while mopping up operations were completed on 22 January.

=== Northern Papua, July 1942 – April 1943 ===
At the same time elements of the PIB and 39th Battalion had been withdrawing along the Kokoda track, other members of the PIB had been cut-off in the Ambasi–Ioma area. One platoon attempted to escape south to Port Moresby but was dispersed or killed, including Smith who was executed by the Japanese after being captured. B Company, PIB had also been isolated when the Japanese landed in the Buna–Gona area in July, and had been ordered to maintain contact with the Japanese and send reports of their activities as they continued to patrol the Waria–Kumusi River region. In September Watson ordered the detachment in the Kumusi area to concentrate around Garaina–Morobe–Mambare from where they would be reinforced. Moving via a route which avoided the Japanese, C Company and battalion headquarters transited Yule Island on 23 September, and after departing Kairuku, crossed the Owen Stanley Range to Garaina, moving then to Popoi on the Waria River, with some men continuing to Ioma. They joined B Company in October and were tasked with contacting the local people to maintain order following the departure of the civil administration, and with rescuing downed Allied airmen. Numbering just 150 men, the PIB attacked Japanese parties retreating to the north coast in November after their defeat at Oivi–Gorari. In January 1943, they intercepted Japanese forces north of Buna and, the following month, assisted in the destruction of Japanese remnants in Papua—killing 200 and capturing three prisoners.

By March 1943 the area between the Kumusi and Waria Rivers had largely been cleared of Japanese forces, with the only significant fighting being an ambush of 14 Japanese at Mogado near the mouth of the Kumusi. Coming under the command of the US 41st Division that month, the PIB advanced with the Americans. After reaching Morobe, they were ordered to return to Bisiatabu, near Port Moresby, for rest, reorganisation and further training, arriving there on 24 April. At this time elements of the battalion had been in action since July 1942; many had been among the first parties over the Owen Stanley Range in June, while the remainder had been in the group that had come forward in September. Due to the harsh conditions prevailing in wartime New Guinea this was a long time to be in action and the battalion was considered to be in need of a break. Although never numbering more than 300 men, the PIB was believed to have killed at least as many Japanese, losing 15 men killed and 35 wounded during the seven months of the Papuan campaign. (Note: According to another source the PIB lost three Australians and eight Papuans to enemy action or illness during this period.) After the battalion returned to Port Moresby in early 1943 the administrative requirements of the unit changed, and the headquarters was subsequently stationed at Bisiatabu, with the rifle companies in the future operating independently under different Australian or US divisions.

The respite was short, as following the recapture of Buna and Sanananda, the Allies planned to move on Lae as part of a series of counter-offensive actions. The PIB was tasked to assist and was reinforced in preparation for these operations, with its strength increased to include a battalion headquarters, headquarter company—including a signals and a pioneer platoon—and three rifle companies. As a result, additional Australian and native personnel were required, and a depot company was added to the establishment to supply trained replacements. Depot Company included native recruits in training, recovering wounded native soldiers awaiting re-posting as reinforcements, and native soldiers employed on guard duties and camp construction. A period of training followed as the new native recruits were taught weapons handling, while the Australians learnt the language of the Papuans and New Guineans under their command, as well as native bush craft. On 1 May 1943, Battalion Headquarters and the Training Depot occupied a camp at Bisiatabu. A Company, PIB under the command of Captain Ernest Hitchcock was the first company to return to action. Departing on 30 May 1943, it came under the command of the US 41st Division for operations at Nassau Bay. B Company, PIB under Captain John Chalk left Bisiatabu on 18 June 1943, moving to Wau to be attached to the Australian 7th Division for operations in the Markham and Ramu Valleys. C Company, PIB under Captain Anthony Leutchford departed on 27 August, moving to Dobuduru to be attached to the Australian 9th Division for the landing at Lae.

=== Salamaua, June – September 1943 ===
Over the period 30 June to 4 July 1943, the US 162nd Regimental Combat Team made an unopposed landing at Nassau Bay and established a beachhead there as part of Operation Cartwheel. Australian support included a platoon from D Company, 2/6th Battalion to act as beach party to deploy lights at the landing zone, and a PIB company to hold the Japanese garrison in place at Cape Dinga on the southern flank. Prior to the landing, on the evening of 28 June A Company, PIB under the command of Hitchcock had moved from Buso to Cape Roon by canoe, from where the Japanese positions at Cape Dinga could be observed. Numbering five Australian officers, 18 Papuan and Australian NCOs, and 119 Papuan soldiers in three platoons, the company prepared to attack the Japanese garrison which was estimated at 300 men from III/102nd Battalion. Following several reconnaissance patrols, Hitchcock finalised plans for the assault. On the evening of 30 June they formed up in a creek just south of Cape Dinga. 5 Platoon under Lieutenant Charles Bishop was tasked with securing the heights, while 4 Platoon under Sergeant Bob MacIlwain would attack the two Bassis villages and capture the Japanese telescope located there. On 1 July a patrol moving along the beach to Nassau Bay killed three Japanese in foxholes. Bishop moved up the ridgeline but met heavy resistance, and the platoon was eventually forced to withdraw. Meanwhile, moving along the beach MacIlwain found one of the villages deserted and the other defended by a strong bunker position, which was then set on fire. The bodies of 26 Japanese were later recovered. With the position captured, Hitchcock moved north to Tabali Creek.

After making contact with American forces, the Papuans continued attacking the Japanese on the northern coast of Cape Dinga, while blocking any attempt to escape inland. The Japanese at Nassau Bay subsequently withdrew, affording the Allied forces a supply point for the subsequent attack against Salamaua, while heavy artillery landed at Nassau Bay was able to shell the area in preparation. The US 3/162nd Battalion landed at Nassau Bay on 6 July. The PIB advanced along the coast ahead of the US 162nd Infantry Regiment and reached Lake Salus on 9 July before pushing on to Tambu Bay as they followed up the withdrawing Japanese. Hitchcock's men were the first to make contact with the Japanese at Tambu Bay and by 14 July they had been able to confirm that Tambu Bay and Dot Inlet were occupied by the Japanese who had fortified the area. A two-man reconnaissance team scouted to the mouth of the lagoon, 3 kilometres (1.9 mi) south of Tambu Bay, and located a Japanese observation post on the northern side, while approximately 200 Japanese soldiers were seen to be dug-in at Boisi in anticipation of an Allied landing. The scouting was later confirmed to be highly accurate. The American advance on Tambu Bay commenced on 18 July, with two companies from the US 3/162nd Battalion moving north along the inland track, and another company moving along the coast; each using guides from the PIB. On 20 July a PIB platoon attacked a Japanese outpost south of Boisi which was holding up the advance of K Company, killing four and allowing the Americans to continue forward. The same day A Company, PIB received reinforcements, including one officer and six NCOs, all European, who arrived from Bisiatabu.

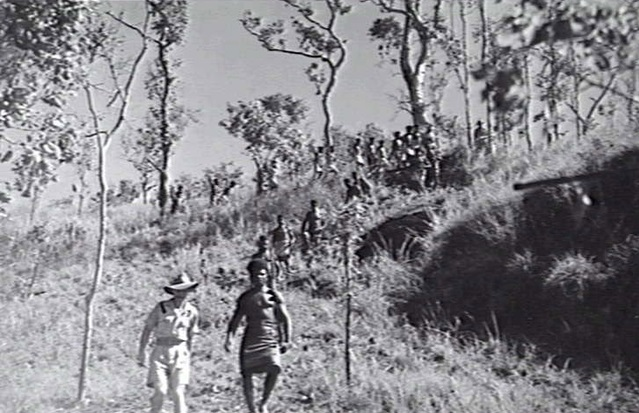
PIB soldiers around Bisiatabu, July 1943

With Tambu Bay occupied, the US 2/162nd Battalion began landing there the same evening. Yet with a key ridgeline known as Roosevelt Ridge remaining in Japanese hands the area was not secure. A PIB platoon was sent up the western side on 22 July, while two US companies unsuccessfully attacked from the east, with another attempt later in the day also failing before they were pushed off the ridge two days later. During fighting on 26 July, A Company, PIB suffered its first fatality, with the death of an Australian corporal attached to I Company on Mount Tambu. From 22 to 24 July two PIB platoons held defensive positions near Boisi, while several sections guarded the track towards Mount Tambu to cut off any Japanese trying to withdraw. Further attempts by the Americans to capture the high ground in late July and early August also failed, despite the landing of artillery. Over 1–9 August the PIB conducted patrols, both independently and attached to the Americans. During this time Hitchcock had to be evacuated to hospital following an attack on Allied artillery positions by Japanese aircraft. On 5 August, 5 Platoon was attacked by Japanese on the ridge above Boisi, losing one killed. Later that night a further two men were wounded on Mount Tambu while attached to K Company. On 9 August a patrol from 4 Platoon clashed with a Japanese pillbox which they assaulted with grenades, losing one Papuan wounded. The Australian 15th and 42nd Battalions were then committed to the fighting, and the PIB provided guides as they moved into position. Further attempts by the Americans finally succeeded in capturing Roosevelt Ridge, after establishing a lodgement at the western end and reducing the remaining defences with artillery between 12–14 August.

On 12 August a company-sized Japanese force from I/162nd Battalion was detected after leaving Salamaua and was believed to be moving against the Allied rear positions and artillery located around Tambu Bay. The raiding party were followed by an American force which succeeded in dispersing a small group south-east of Mount Tambu on the 13th. With the pursuit continuing, a PIB platoon was tasked with guarding a US artillery battery on the southern side of Tambu Bay on 12 August, and was reinforced by another platoon two days later. Clashes between patrolling Australian and US infantry and the Japanese continued over the following days and by 16 August the raiders had split into three groups. Attacking the Australian and US gunlines that morning the Japanese were repulsed, while the guns remained intact. That morning a Papuan platoon also clashed with the Japanese, killing three and a native guide just after midday, before establishing an ambush above the 1700 feature during the afternoon. A patrol encountered a large Japanese force on a narrow spur and the platoon was forced to withdraw before being surrounded, moving down the track towards Cochrane Beach where they were resupplied. They reoccupied the feature that night and dug-in. The following day they clashed with more Japanese patrols, ambushing them and forcing their withdrawal under the cover of artillery, which then compelled the Papuans to retire again. Hitchcock ordered the patrols continue, and the Papuans were sent back up the ridgeline, patrolling until relieved by US forces. With the raid having failed, the surviving Japanese attempted to withdraw to Mount Tambu but were pursued by Australian and US patrols, with the majority of the force being destroyed. Skirmishes occurred west of the 1700 feature, with the Papuans dispersing a force of approximately 20 Japanese on 18 August.

By 20 August A Company, PIB occupied a line from Scout Ridge north of Boisi to the 1700 feature behind Salus, and the ridgeline just north of Salus Lakes, in an area which had been mostly cleared of the Japanese. They then began to move towards Boisi. During this time other members of the company were detached as scouts working with the Americans. After concentrating at Boisi, they rested for several days. Now under divisional control, the Papuans prepared to move towards Salamaua with orders to conduct reconnaissance and to cut off any Japanese withdrawing through the area. Setting out on 28 August a Papuan patrol under Lieutenant Dick Gore observed a Japanese force in Lokanu before moving inland to bypass them. Leaving some men at Charlie Hill, the remainder of the company continued south the next day before taking up positions along a creek east of Mount Tambu. The Papuans were then tasked with finding a Japanese artillery piece located on the ridgeline below Nuknuk which controlled the approaches from Komiatum towards Salamaua. The gun had been mounted on a section of railway track and was being concealed in a tunnel cut into the side of the ridge, preventing it from being targeted by Allied aircraft and counter-battery fire. A patrol from 4 Platoon was able to determine its approximate position after questioning the local people, and a small group of three Papuans under Lance Corporal Bengari then infiltrated Japanese lines to confirm its location. After pin-pointing the gun they returned to Komiatum. Bengari then guided an Australian company-sized patrol to the position and destroyed the gun and killed its crew using grenades, while the Australians fought the Japanese inside the tunnel. A heavy engagement developed as the Japanese attempted to reinforce the position, with the fighting continuing until dusk before they were forced to retreat. The Australians also withdrew, moving back to Bobdubi.

A number of Papuan sections were still detached, operating with the Australian and US battalions in the area. Meanwhile, the remainder of the Company continued to patrol over 6–7 September without contact. Finally, by 8 September the Japanese began to withdraw from Salamaua. On 11 September the elements from A Company, PIB which had remained on Charlie Hill, cautiously moved into Salamaua which they found largely destroyed, with decaying food, rubbish and Japanese corpses strewn among the ruins. They subsequently withdrew. The Papuans were then tasked with clearing the beach from Kela Point, Malolo Mission, Buakap and Busama. Patrolling to the ridge overlooking the mission no Japanese were observed. However, on 13 September when the Papuans entered Malolo they were engaged by a Japanese machine-gun from long range, which was then destroyed by 1 Platoon. Company Headquarters was then set up in the village, and from there they patrolled along the beach through Busama, towards the swamps around Labu. Sweeping through the area, the main Japanese force was found to have withdrawn, while the Papuans moved as far as the mouth of the Markham River and then through the swamps to the foothills. Following the return of the Company's various detachments it concentrated at Malolo, before moving to a new camp at Boisi for a period of rest. By 27 September A Company had returned to Tambu Bay in preparation to leave for Lae. Losses during the Salamaua campaign amounted to two killed and 14 wounded.

=== Markham Valley–Lae, June – October 1943 ===
Australian units had been operating in the Markham Valley since the Japanese landing at Lae in March 1942. Initially these forces had been limited to the NGVR; however, they were later replaced by AIF units. The 57th/60th Battalion, 15th Brigade took over responsibility for the area and the road through the Watut Valley to Bulolo and Wau in June 1943. B Company, PIB under the command of Captain John Chalk, was subsequently attached to the battalion for scouting and patrolling, leaving Port Moresby on 26 June and flying to Wau, before moving to Bulolo and then down the track to the Wampit River where they established a base on 1 July. Allocated a large area of operations, B Company was tasked with patrolling the southern bank of the Markham River, from Wanton River to New Labu Island. Standing patrols and platoon outposts were established, with 6 Platoon at Oomsis and 8 Platoon at Bob's Camp, while additional detachments operated out of Ngaragooma and Deep Creek. Meanwhile, 7 Platoon was detached to the 57th/60th Battalion at Tsili Tsili. The first contact occurred on 9 July, when a party from 6 Platoon was fired on near Deep Creek. As the patrols continued the Papuans developed a detailed map of the area and Japanese movements, while continuing to observe Japanese dispositions on the northern bank. A 50-man patrol moved through to the Buang River in mid-July. On 24 July a Papuan soldier was killed by a bomb dropped by Japanese aircraft as they flew over the New Mari villages en route to Lae. The following day B Company suffered further losses after a patrol led by Sergeant Owen Reynolds was ambushed at close range near Deep Creek. A Papuan corporal took command after Reynolds was mortally wounded, withdrawing the patrol under heavy fire. On 1 August a party of engineers was escorted by 8 Platoon to the Markham River as part of a reconnaissance to identify possible crossing points for an assault on Nadzab.

On 9 August, a patrol from 8 Platoon to New Labu Island was attacked by a group of Japanese and hostile villagers, with two Papuans and a number of Japanese killed. Although costly, the patrol confirmed the Japanese were unaware of Allied preparations to attack Nadzab. B Company continued patrolling the southern bank of the Markham River, reporting on troop movements and dispositions. On 24 August they came under command of New Guinea Force and were ordered to prepare for the crossing of the Markham and assault on Nadzab. The PIB subsequently manned staging camps and guard posts along the river, which were in place by 27 August. In early September they patrolled between Mount Ngaroneno and the mouth of the Watut River to ensure it was clear of Japanese forces. Meanwhile, a small party crossed the Markham in a rubber dingy, scouting towards the proposed drop zone. On 4 September, a force, including the 2/2nd Pioneer Battalion, and engineers from 2/6th Field Company married up with B Company, PIB, at Kirkland's Crossing after moving overland from Tsili Tsili, and began to prepare the airfield. With the campaign reaching a crucial point, a combined landing at Nadzab by US paratroopers and Australian artillery took place on 5 September. During the landing the Papuans picqueted the south bank of the Markham, and with the pioneers successfully establishing a beachhead they then crossed with the engineers. As the airdrop proceeded, the Papuans were tasked with assisting to secure the upper Markham Valley against any possible Japanese move to reinforce Lae from Madang. With Nadzab captured preparations began to allow the Australian 7th Division to fly in so as to complete the encirclement of Lae, following landings to its east by the 9th Division which had begun the day before.

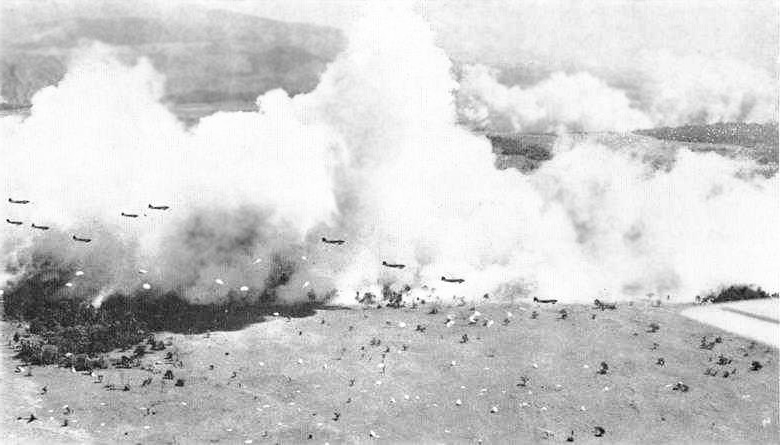
USAAF C-47s drop a battalion of the US 503rd Parachute Regiment at Nadzab, 5 September 1943.

Moving forward to the Erap River, B Company, PIB set up camp and began patrolling the western approaches to Nadzab. During a patrol with US infantry on 13 September, one Australian and two Americans were killed when they were ambushed. A number of patrols subsequently clashed with the Japanese, with a patrol killing two Japanese after crossing the flooded Busu River near Boana, while another on 16 September killed five Japanese. 8 Platoon was then detached to the 2/14th Battalion at Camp Diddy and moved towards Boana with the aim of cutting off any Japanese withdrawing from Lae. 6 Platoon, which had originally been left to patrol the Nadzab–Lae area, was then recalled and moved up the Markham River, occupying Sasiang. On 19 September the 2/6th Independent Company prepared to attack Kaiapit, and a section of Papuans from 7 Platoon accompanied them to contact the local people and start to repair the airstrip once it had been secured for use in an emergency. The commandos assaulted Kaiapit late that afternoon, seizing an outpost following a number of bayonet charges, before digging-in that evening. The rest of B Company, PIB had remained at Sangan but was later ordered forward to a point 1.6 kilometres (1 mi) from Kaipit with the reserve ammunition and to cover the wounded. In position just after dawn the next morning they clashed with a group of Japanese, killing five of them. During the day the Japanese counter-attacked the Australians but were driven out of Kaiapit with very heavy losses. Japanese casualties included 214 killed and a further 50 probably killed, while the Australians lost 14 killed and 23 wounded.

B Company, PIB moved forward to Kaiapit on 21 September to join the commandos. With the Japanese remaining in the area its two platoons occupied a number of positions astride the track from Kaiapit to the Mission and on Mission Hill, while transport aircraft began to land on the hastily cleared airstrip with reinforcements. In the late afternoon a Papuan platoon attacked a Japanese squad. The survivors then attempted to withdraw, only to clash with another PIB platoon and were killed, with one Papuan wounded. That evening the Japanese counter-attacked the Papuan positions around the Mission, only to be driven back after heavy fighting which resulted in a number of civilian casualties after the village had been accidentally hit by stray small-arms fire. By first light on 22 September the Japanese had withdrawn from Kaiapit. Elsewhere, 8 Platoon—which was still detached—had been involved with a number of other units in the pursuit of a large Japanese force of approximately 300 retreating from Lae, but had been unable to make contact before the Australian force was withdrawn to be retasked. With Kaiapit now secured the Papuans were given the task of patrolling ahead of the pursuing Australian force as they followed the Japanese into the Ramu Valley.

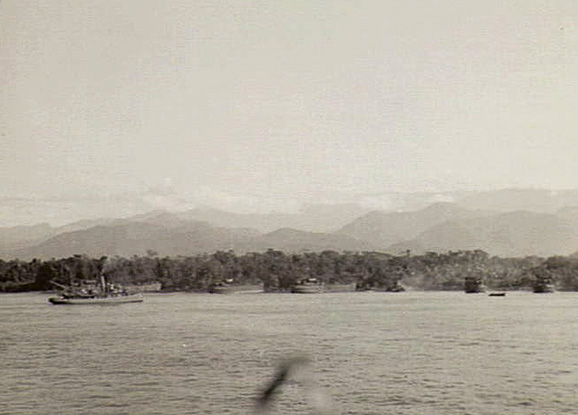
The Australian 9th Division landing east of Lae.

While operations were continuing in the Markham Valley to the north-west, C Company, PIB under the command of Leutchford had been operating with the 9th Division following its landing at Lae. The Papuans carried out scouting and reconnaissance patrols on the coastal plain to the east of the town and in the mountain ranges to the north, and later harassed retreating Japanese troops attempting to move through the Saruwaged Mountains, operating from Gawan and Musom in the south, Boana in the west, and Mount Salawaket in the north-east. Landing on Red Beach on 5 September, after leaving 10 Platoon to dig-in on the beach, the Papuan company moved west towards Lae. That morning Japanese bombers had attacked the beach, causing a large number of allied casualties. One of the Papuans from 10 Platoon subsequently died of his wounds. Meanwhile, the remainder of C Company married-up with the 2/4th Independent Company and moved to the Singaua Plantation. 9 Platoon then moved to the Busu River crossing, being attached to the 24th Brigade for the advance along the coastal route. At the same time 10 and 11 Platoons advanced in front of the 26th Brigade as it moved up the Burep River via the inland route. By 10 September the platoons were between the Busu and Burep Rivers, while one was below Musom village downstream. Over the next few days reconnaissance patrols clashed with the Japanese, killing a number of them. With the 7th and 9th Divisions converging on Lae the town fell to the Australians on 16 September. As Japanese forces attempted to escape a number were killed by PIB patrols during a series of clashes and ambushes up to 19 September.

Although C Company was earmarked for the upcoming landing at Finschhafen, the need to cut-off the Japanese retreat meant 11 Platoon would remain behind at Gawan, north of Lae, while the remainder of the company redeployed. 11 Platoon was then tasked with patrolling to Mililunga and along the Boana track until relieved by A Company in late October. By 28 September A Company, PIB had completed their redeployment from Tambu Bay to Lae, establishing a headquarters at Old Yanga village. 1 Platoon moved north along the Busu to take over from 11 Platoon, C Company, while 5 Platoon was still operating around Labu Swamp. 4 Platoon patrolled to Gwabadik village and from there to Musom, then north towards Kemen. 3 Platoon moved to Sugarloaf to be attached to the 15th Battalion. Over the following days 4 and 5 Platoon had contacts with small groups of Japanese fleeing Lae. On the morning of 13 October a 4 Platoon patrol attacked a group of hungry Japanese in Kemen, killing eight soldiers and capturing two officers. On 15 October, 5 Platoon located Japanese equipment and other evidence of a group moving towards Markham Point; making contact the following day they killed five. On 17 October two sections from A Company were detached to the 29th/46th Battalion during mopping up operations between Mongi River and Finschhafen. While patrolling the area villagers informed them the Japanese were withdrawing towards Sattelberg. Patrols also continued in the lower Markham, and north of Lae another difficult patrol was conducted over a 10-day period from Bungalumba to Mount Saruwaket via a disused and overgrown track. They subsequently detected a group of Japanese that had crossed the range towards Iloko and Sio. By the end of November A Company, minus the sections on the Mongi River, was back at Old Yanga where they prepared to move to Finschhafen. Meanwhile, there were also 100 local recruits at Old Yanga, and this later became PIB Sub-Depot Lae.

=== Ramu Valley, October 1943 – January 1945 ===
While the Lae campaign continued, the 7th Division pursued the Japanese into the Ramu Valley as they retreated following the fighting at Kaiapit. The main Japanese force withdrew via a route to the north from Dumpu, over the Finisterres Ranges at Kankiryo Saddle, in the direction of Madang. Meanwhile, a small force had withdrawn directly down the Ramu Valley. B Company, PIB under command of Chalk was subsequently attached to the 21st Brigade which was tasked with harassing this group. During a number of patrols in September extended operations ranged as far north as the Annenberg villages before being involved in a minor skirmish with the Japanese at Naruapan. Unopposed, B Company continued up the Markham Valley, linking up with the 2/6th Independent Company at Marawasa. At Haus Sak Sak on the southern side of the Upper Ramu they set up camp, with the Papuans patrolling the area to the north. Company Headquarters then moved to Kaigulan on the north bank of the Ramu. On 3 October a patrol from 6 Platoon ran into a small group of Japanese at Bopi, capturing a prisoner. The headquarters then moved to Dumpu airstrip. On 13 October a platoon patrol of the foothills behind Kumbrarum located a Japanese gun that had been shelling the 31st Battalion, and it was later destroyed by an airstrike. 7 Platoon then patrolled up the bank of the Faria River to Guy's Post on the eastern side of Shaggy Ridge, while a section patrol continued to Mount Prothero, crossing the range at the top of the Mindjim River, moving through Japanese territory for seven days. On 22 October, 6 Platoon departed on seven day patrol of the headwaters of the Mene River. On their return a section with fifty carriers attached patrolled deep into the ranges near Kankiryo Ridge over 13 days, returning without making contact with the Japanese. By late October the 7th Division and its attachments, including the Papuans, had succeeded in driving the Japanese from the Ramu Valley and into the Finisterres; however, supply problems prevented further advances.

During this time the remainder of the company had been resting at Kumbarum, awaiting the return of the other patrols. On 6 November they moved forward into the Yogi River region, 10 kilometres (6 mi) to the west. 6 and 7 Platoons then crossed the Ramu, patrolling the area around Mount Otto on the edge of the Central Highlands. The 7th Division had been tasked with preventing Japanese penetration of the Ramu and Markham Valleys using screening patrols during October and November. On 9 November B Company, PIB was ordered to relieve the 2/6th Independent Company around Kesawai, and it subsequently crossed the Evapia River and commenced patrols in the area around the 5800 feature. One patrol clashed with a Japanese patrol of around 20 men, coming under heavy fire before repelling them. The company then took up defensive positions to guard the area from the Kesawai villages to the northern ridge of the 5800 feature. Continuing to patrol the area, information on Japanese activity was gained from the villages to the north, while a number of minor clashes with small Japanese groups occurred, resulting in one Papuan being wounded. On 26 November a three-man standing patrol on the perimeter near Kesawai killed one Japanese soldier and wounded another. On 30 November a platoon crossed the Ramu, patrolling into Waimeriba village.

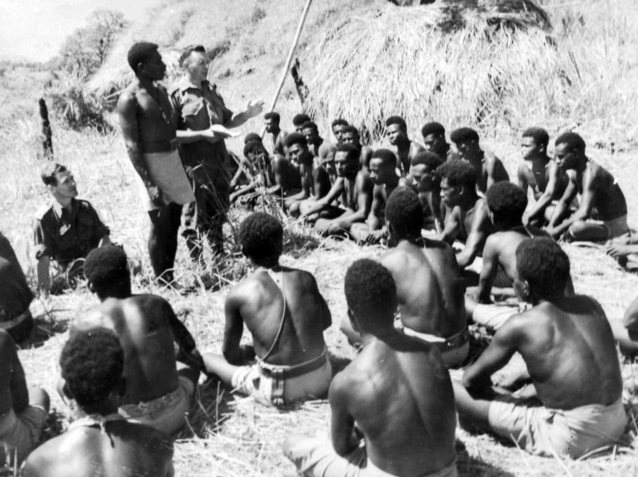
Members of the Papuan Infantry Battalion at Mass in the Ramu Valley, October 1943

From 1 December 1943, B Company, PIB came under command of the 25th Brigade and occupied positions on the banks of Evapia River prior to the arrival of the 7th Division. The Papuans sent out a clearing patrol north-east of Kesawai No. 1 which reported the area clear, while another patrol from the 5800 feature observed a large Japanese force to the north of the Taipa villages but avoided contact. Later a section from 7 Platoon killed a Japanese officer and wounded a soldier in an ambush. Meanwhile, there had been other signs of Japanese movement detected in the area, indicating the possibility of a major action against Allied forces in the Ramu Valley and Finisterres. Japanese forces were more active in the west, while the Australian positions in this area were dangerously dispersed, with a large distance between the Papuans around the 5800 feature and the 2/6th Independent Company to their left on the Solu River, with this gap considered to be vulnerable to infiltration. By 7 December B Company, PIB was located on a position astride the main track running north-south on the 5800 feature, with 7 Platoon under the command of Lieutenant Ed Bishop on the forward perimeter, on a spur to the north of the feature.

After midnight on 7/8 December the booby traps in front of 7 Platoon exploded as a large Japanese force estimated at approximately two companies assaulted the forward Papuan section, guided by hostile natives. The Papuans stood-to defend their position, and succeeded in holding the attackers at bay for the next two hours for the loss of two men killed, while a runner broke through and alerted the platoon commander. The Japanese then attacked the platoon main defensive position from two sides. At 03:00 Chalk attempted to contact 7 Platoon by field telephone, but was unsuccessful. The fighting continued until around 0900, by which time 7 Platoon had run out of ammunition. Surrounded and with the telephone wires back to the company position cut there was no chance of resupply. The platoon was forced to withdraw with Bishop leading a breakout, during which heavy casualties were inflicted on the Japanese. However, with the men forced to move individually many became separated, while several were injured by their own booby-traps, and others were wounded by Japanese fire as they attempted to move back to Australian lines. After occupying the position, the Japanese fired a number of flares which signalled a line of carriers to bring up reinforcements and supplies. At 11:00 a Papuan lance corporal made it back to the company position and reported the situation, while later a sergeant and 10 native soldiers also returned. However, with most of 7 Platoon till missing, Chalk was ordered to withdraw B Company, PIB to the Evapia River.

Part of a Japanese attempt to push the Australians off the hills and into the Ramu Valley, the attack was followed by moves against positions held by the 2/6th Independent Company on 8 December which forced a number to be withdrawn, while other elements were cut-off. However, in the days that followed the Australians regrouped, while reinforcements moved forward as the Japanese dug-in. On 9 December the Japanese held positions above Kesawai were heavily attacked by Allied aircraft. Meanwhile, many of the PIB survivors had started to make their way back; even still, by that evening of those that had been on the 5800 feature, Bishop, four Australian NCOs, and 12 Papuans remained missing. Over next few days a number of others made it through to the forward positions of the 2/25th Battalion around Kesawai, and by 11 December Bishop, two NCOs and one wounded Papuan had been located, accounting for the last of the missing. Total PIB casualties during the fighting had been three killed and two wounded. On 16 December the company moved again, crossing the Ramu River to establish a patrol base to cover the Kobon–Koropa–Soly River area. From this position the company continued to patrol until 3 January 1944. Following six months of active service it was withdrawn, returning to Bisiatabu near Port Moresby for rest. After leave, a period of training and regrouping followed. Meanwhile, the 7th Division cleared Shaggy Ridge on 23 January 1944.

In June 1944 B Company, PIB—still under the command of Chalk—returned to Dumpu, relieving the carrier company of the Australian 11th Division. From mid August to 9 November patrols of the area were conducted from Dumpu, while others were also conducted from Annenberg towards the Kreram River to west, as well as downstream to Schillings Plantation. On 9 November a patrol under Lieutenant Thomas Bruce departed by canoe to investigate an island downstream near Anjetti. As they attempted to land they were engaged by a group of Japanese. Bruce was killed in the opening volley, and although the patrol managed to reach the safety of the river bank it was later discovered that six Papuans were also missing. Despite efforts to find them, their bodies were never recovered. Over the days that followed reinforcements were flown to Annenberg, while aircraft flew reconnaissance missions over Anjetti but were unable to locate the Japanese force. In late November the company, minus 6 Platoon, was ordered to return to Bisiatabu near Port Moresby. Meanwhile, 6 Platoon remained at Annenberg, continuing routine patrolling until early January 1945 when it was also withdrawn.

=== Finschhafen, September 1943 – January 1944 ===
While B Company was fighting in the Markham and Ramu Valley campaign, A and C Companies were involved in the capture of Finschafen and Sattelberg, before pursuing the Japanese along the northern coastline of the Huon Peninsula towards Saidor between September 1943 and January 1944. With the fall of Lae occurring more quickly than expected the 20th Brigade of the 9th Division had been retasked to capture Finschhafen in the next in the series of amphibious operations. From there they would begin the advance towards Sio, further around the coast on the northern side of the Huon Peninsula. C Company, PIB under Leutchford (minus 11 Platoon which remained at Lae until early November) was detailed to be part of the landing at Scarlet Beach. They would be tasked with patrolling and helping ANGAU recruit local carriers. However, Japanese strength had been significantly underestimated by the Allied command, and with more than 5,000 troops in the area Scarlet Beach was strongly defended. Following a naval bombardment, the landing went ahead before dawn at around 0500 on the morning of 22 September. Due to the darkness, a strong current, and faulty maps, a navigational error resulted in the first and second waves mistakenly landing at Siki Cove, approximately 900 metres (1,000 yd) to the south, and avoiding the main Japanese defences as a result. The third wave landed correctly at Scarlet Beach and found itself heavily engaged.

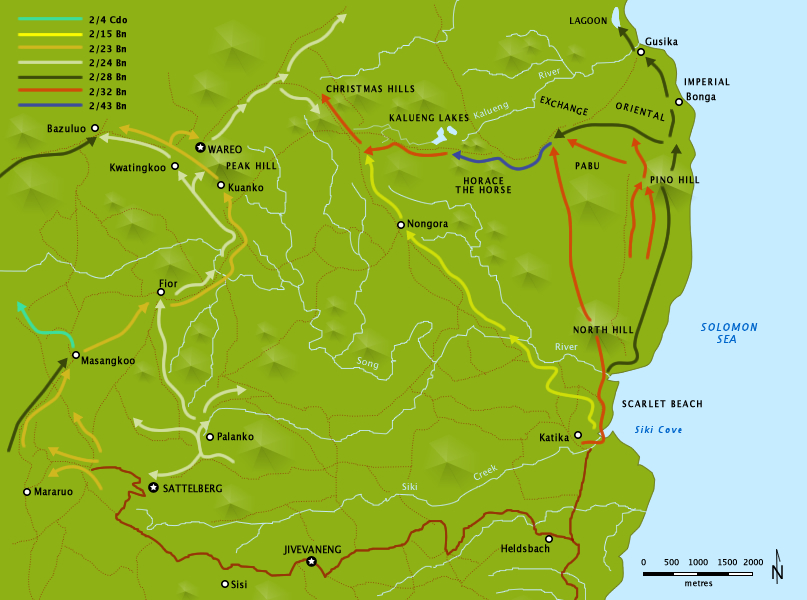
Huon Peninsula, Papua New Guinea

10 Platoon landed on the northern end of Siki Cove with the second wave of the 2/13th and 2/17th Battalions and was unopposed. Moving up the beach quickly to the palm trees they turned towards Katika to the south to attack Japanese positions defending the beach. They then came under fire from both Japanese and Australian troops and sustained several men wounded. 9 Platoon and Company Headquarters then landed with the third wave containing the 2/15th Battalion at Scarlet Beach. Strongly resisted by the Japanese who held their fire until the last moment, the Australian force landed under heavy machine-gun fire. The craft carrying the Papuans was hit, damaging the landing mechanism and jamming the ramp half-open, which forced them to disembark over the side into deep water. First out, Leutchford was shot almost immediately. Badly wounded, he soon fell unconscious. Still heavily engaged, he was supported in the water by a Papuan police sergeant attached to the company for the operation, and was then dragged ashore with the assistance of a nearby Australian soldier. Heavy fighting continued on the beach as the Australians and Papuans pushed the Japanese defenders back over the next half hour, by which time Leutchford had died of his wounds. Meanwhile, although a section had become separated and was forced to fight past a number of bunkers, 9 Platoon overran the Japanese trenches and dug-in. Several members were wounded in the fighting during this period. Despite the initial confusion caused by landing in the wrong place, the Australians eventually regained control of the scattered troops and disentangled the different units which had become intermingled on the beach. By daylight they had succeeded in securing the beach and the jungle fringe, mopping up the fixed Japanese defences behind it and then pushing through them, before beginning to consolidate the beachhead.

At dawn C Company, PIB moved back to the beach to regroup, with Lieutenant Colin Rice assuming temporary command as the platoons prepared to set off towards their objectives. 10 Platoon cleared the beach north toward Bonga which was found to have been vacated, while 9 Platoon moved south, conducting a reconnaissance along the Sattelberg Road in the direction of Tareko. The following morning they moved up the road towards Jivevaneng, probing in front of the advancing Australians. Reaching the mission station 9 Platoon found it deserted, and it was subsequently occupied. An area of tactical importance due to its dominating position and the observation it provided, D Company, 2/17th Battalion pushed past the mission, and by 25 September was 5 kilometres (3.1 mi) west before meeting resistance. Confronted by a strong Japanese force, the Australians were forced back to Jivevaneng, but repelled six strong attacks on their position over the following days before being relieved by two platoons from the 2/43rd Battalion under Captain Eric Grant. On 30 September Grant's understrength company and the Papuans from 9 Platoon were surrounded and cut-off but were able to hold off a number of attacks over the next four days. An attempt by two other Australian companies to break through failed before a PIB sergeant and a group of scouts from the main force was finally guided into the position by two Papuans that had been sent out to through Japanese lines. On 4 October they led the encircled force out carrying their wounded, just hours before a relief force finally pushed its way through. Meanwhile, Finschhafen had fallen two days earlier. During this time 10 Platoon had been working with the 2/3rd Pioneer Battalion which was guarding the approach between the Song River and North Hill.

To replace Leutchford, Dick Gore from A Company was promoted to captain and took over command of C Company. PIB patrols operated in a number of areas, with platoons scouting Japanese positions and providing guides to the Australian battalions. With demand for the Papuans high, the sections were scattered and command and control became difficult. On 12 October C Company, PIB came under the direct command of the 9th Division and was tasked with gathering information about the terrain and deep patrolling into the Bonga–Warea and Wareo–Sattelberg–Mararuo areas. The Japanese counter-attack against Jivevaneng and Scarlet Beach on 16–17 October subsequently failed, and they were pushed back into the mountains towards Sattelberg and Wareo. A section from 10 Platoon occupying a guard position in front of the 2/17th Battalion was involved in the fighting on the morning on the 16th coming under heavy fire, although it was able to withdraw without loss. The Japanese then moved in reinforcements in an attempt to dislodge the Allied forces, threatening the area between Scarlet Beach and Siki Creek. On 18 October a Papuan patrol reported Japanese on the Song River. However, after heavy fighting the Japanese counter-attack finally ran out of steam. Meanwhile, the 2/17th Battalion had been holding on at Jivevaneng but were running low on supplies and their lines of communication had become cut. On 19 October a PIB patrol succeeded in moving across country from Tareko to Jivevaneng with supplies.

Following the completion of its operations around Lae, 11 Platoon rejoined the remainder of C Company. Heavily tasked, on 23 October the company was ordered to support both the 20th Brigade and 22nd Battalion, and the 24th and 26th Brigades. PIB patrols attached to the 2/43rd Battalion reconnoitred the strategically important Bonga–Gusika track, as well as Pino Hill and the Exchange and Oriental features which dominated it. Strongly contested, control of the area change hands a number of times during the fighting, and the patrols observed Japanese movements over the next few days. Following the defeat of the Japanese counter-offensive the Australians were ordered to clear the area and secure the coastline north to Sio. The Japanese were subsequently observed using the area as an evacuation and supply route before the patrol withdrew. Elements of the PIB and 2/43rd Battalion then scouted Pino Hill in preparation for retaking the area. These patrols detected Japanese reinforcements landing by barge, prompting the Australians to resume their offensive in an attempt to capture the high ground around Sattelberg and advance to the Gusika–Wareo line, while Japanese supply lines were attacked. In early November an observation post was established, while PIB and 2/43rd Battalion patrols watched Japanese movements on the Gusik–Wareo track. Patrols also probed north, locating a number of Japanese units in the vicinity of Bonga and Pino Hill. A five-man PIB patrol disguised as local villagers set up an observation post north of Bonga between 9 and 11 November, from where they detected a sizable Japanese force. A similar four-man patrol later penetrated Japanese lines near Wareo and remained in position for two days. The observation post also continued to be manned. On 20 November a patrol along the coastal track encountered significant Japanese forces south of Bonga and was forced to withdraw.

A Japanese counter-attack along the coast began on 22 November but was held by a company from the 2/43rd Battalion, while Sattelberg Mountain—which dominated the area—finally fell on 25 November. In contrast to the previous operation at Lae which had been captured unexpectedly quickly, Finschhafen had taken over two months, despite predictions by GHQ that it would only take two weeks. Finally the Japanese began to retreat. Yet despite losing Sattelberg, they continued to hold positions on the high ground at Wareo and to its north. During difficult fighting the Australians pushed north and then west across the Huon Peninsula while the Japanese left rearguards to delay them. Combined patrols from the 2/43rd Battalion and the PIB moved north searching for the Japanese and found hundreds of abandoned trenches and about 40 dead, before encountering Japanese rearguard parties on the afternoon of the 24th. A group of Papuans was then involved in helping secure the supply line, escorting carriers with men from the 2/43rd Battalion to Pebu over 24–25 November. On the afternoon of 25 November an Australian warrant officer from the PIB and a Papuan soldier, along with two Australian signallers from the 2/43rd Battalion, were killed by a Japanese machine-gun whilst moving forward to repair a field telephone line cut by the retreating Japanese. Meanwhile, in an attempt to regain Pabu the Japanese reoccupied Pino Hill, only to be forced to abandon in the face of a deliberate attack by infantry from the 2/32nd Battalion supported by four Matilda tanks, and heavy preparatory fire from the artillery, with 9 Platoon, PIB attached as scouts.

An advance to the Wareo-Gusika line then began, with 9 Platoon moving forward to occupy North Hill, while 10 Platoon supported the 26th Brigade by conducting probes to the Song River and Fior village to the north. The Song River was the main obstacle in the way of the Australian advance and prior to withdrawing the Japanese had destroyed the only bridge across it, requiring an alternative to be found. 10 Platoon then supported the 2/15th Battalion to capture Nongora, which finally fell on 2 December after heavy fighting. With the Japanese in full retreat towards Wareo, C Company PIB was tasked with cutting them off. Section from 10 Platoon worked with the 2/4th Commando Squadron, while 9 Platoon conducted harassing operations to the west near Joangeng. On 6 December 9 Platoon initiated a successful ambush north of Gusika, killing six Japanese. However, Gore's men had been in action for over three months and as a consequence C Company was ordered to be relieved by A Company, PIB before moving to the Kulungtufu–Hube area for rest. Meanwhile, commencing on 3 December, the Australian 4th Brigade began its advance up the coast from Gusika, leading the opening phase of the Australian advance towards Sio.

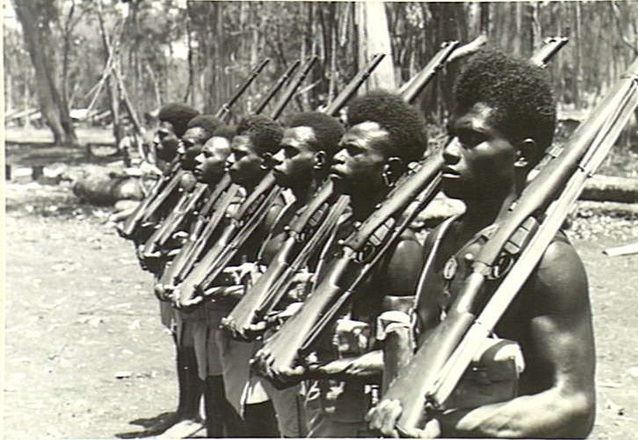
PIB soldiers around the Song River, March 1944

A Company, PIB departed Lae on 10 December via sea to Finschhafen. Establishing a base camp at Coconut Beach at the mouth of the Tunom River, the first patrols moved out on 16 December. Moving inland to a position on the Song River, members of 3 Platoon were involved in tracking a group of Japanese soldiers after a sentry from a nearby Australian battalion had been killed during the night. The Papuans accompanied an Australian patrol the next day which followed the Japanese through thick kunai grass up towards the Sowi River where they came under fire. Unsure of the size of the force the patrol went to the ground. Deciding to outflank the Japanese, they located and killed a group of six Japanese in a concealed position. Meanwhile, elements of 5 Platoon reached the Sanga River to the south of Aimoloa, while another patrol moved up the coast towards Lakona in front of the 24th Brigade. A Company, PIB forded the Masaweng River at the Mikos No. 1 on 22 December. During the crossing a PIB patrol had detected a number of Japanese soldiers entering an observation post that had been set up in a cliff overhang. A section under Corporal Tapioli moved forward to observe the position but he was seen by a Japanese soldier. Tapioli immediately killed the Japanese soldier and then charged the cave mouth followed by the rest of his men. All the Japanese were killed in the ensuing action and their bodies thrown into the river. By late December the 4th Brigade had advanced past Fortification Point, and was relieved by the 20th Brigade. Dead, wounded and starving Japanese were increasingly encountered by the Australians as they moved towards the Rai coast. 3 Platoon then conducted a long-range patrol, gathering information on retreating Japanese forces moving towards Zagahemi, during which they surprised and killed four on a track near Nompua.

In the Kulungtufu area C Company, PIB under Gore commenced patrolling and later constructed a light aircraft strip which was completed Christmas. Over the following weeks a series of long patrols were conducted into the Cromwell Range and the region beyond, while a patrol from 9 Platoon moved over the headwaters of the Mongi River and the mountains to reach Indagen village. Numerous traces of the retreating Japanese forces were located; however, the only contact occurred in early January 1944. Setting out on 6 January a 40-man patrol under Sergeant Frederick Bendall was ambushed around noon and the Papuans dropped their rifles in the panic. Rapidly withdrawing they were chased by the Japanese. Stopping to drink at a creek the Papuans were attacked, and Bendall returned fire with his Owen gun, killing a Japanese soldier as the Papuans withdrew again. The chase continued and by late afternoon they were cornered. Almost unarmed they were forced to scale a cliff near a waterfall to escape. A thick mist provided some concealment; however, one of the Papuans fell during the climb and was believed to have died. With little food and water the patrol struggled across the mountains for six days before finally reaching Finschhafen. (Note: According to Byrne the Papuan soldier was only injured and after being left for dead returned to the company position days later, following treatment he was evacuated to hospital.) A number of patrols were then sent out looking for the missing men. However, following their return the patrols continued, with one resulting in four Japanese killed. C Company was withdrawn in early February, moving back to their old camp on the Song River. During the campaign the company lost ten men killed.

=== Saidor–Sio, January – March 1944 ===
A Company was now the only operational PIB sub-unit, continuing to support the 20th Brigade's pursuit of the Japanese as they withdrew towards Saidor. Initially under the command of Lieutenant Ernest Vickery after Hitchcock went on leave in November, the company was involved in heavy contact with the Japanese retreating from Fortification Point to Sio, and then along the Rai coast to Saidor. Papuan patrols had previously operated in support of Australian forces moving against Fortification Point prior to its capture in late December 1943, and afterwards had supported the continuing pursuit by deep patrolling on the flank to the west. On 24 December 3 Platoon left on a three-week patrol inland through Hompua to Zagahemi during which they killed three Japanese. The platoon was then attached to the 2/4th Commando Squadron, patrolling south of the Masaweng River. During this time a patrol from 5 Platoon killed another three Japanese. On 29 December, A Company Headquarters and the remainder of the company not on patrol moved to Anchorage Point by barge, before continuing north to Walingai and Kanomi. Meanwhile, 4 Platoon patrolled inland for four days, returning via the coast to Kanomi.

As part of a series of amphibious assaults by US forces beginning at Torokina in Bougainville in early November 1943, Arawe in south-west New Britain in mid-December, and at Cape Gloucester at the western end of New Britain late that same month, on 2 January 1944 the US 126th Regiment landed at Saidor, some 160 kilometres (99 mi) in front of the Australian 9th Division which was advancing along the New Guinea coast having been tasked with capturing Finschafen and securing the area north to Sio. As a result, the surviving elements of the Japanese 20th and 51st Divisions on the Huon Peninsula were compelled to withdraw over the Finisterre Range. Yet the Americans ultimately failed to seize the opportunity to destroy the withdrawing Japanese and despite a heavy toll from disease and starvation they succeeded in reaching Madang, with many Japanese surviving to continue fighting before they were finally cornered by the Australians during the Aitape–Wewak campaign in 1945. Meanwhile, during 4 Platoon's patrol they had been attacked by hostile natives before reaching Karako. On 4 January they clashed with the Japanese north of Walingi, killing four. The next day Company Headquarters moved to Sialum by barge.

A Company, PIB started moving along the coast, while a four-man patrol from 4 Platoon tasked with probing inland moved in front of a platoon from D Company, 2/24th Battalion. This patrol located the bodies of number of Japanese who had starved to death, while a number of others in ill health were also killed in clashes, being indicative of the acute supply problems the Japanese were now experiencing. On 9 January Company Headquarters moved to Kelanoa Harbour, then coming under command of the 20th Brigade (less 4 Platoon). Moving rapidly, the Papuans supported a company of the 2/17th Battalion, crossing the Kapugara River on 13 January. After crossing the Goaling River the Papuans entered the village of Nambariwa, which had been a used previously by the Japanese. Six Japanese were killed, while the bodies of nine more were located in remains of the settlement. On 15 January the 20th Brigade captured Sio, completing the 9th Division's quick sweep up the coast against light Japanese resistance. The 9th Division was then relieved by the Australian 5th Division for the continuing pursuit of the Japanese as they withdrew. A Company Headquarters next moved to Sio, while on 18 January three Japanese were killed by a patrol behind the mission there. Meanwhile, the same day a patrol from 4 Platoon attached to the 2/48th Battalion killed four unarmed Japanese carrying rice. On 21 January the Papuans came under the command of the 8th Brigade, and continued scouting and patrol tasks. The following day a patrol sent to Lembangando Mission to investigate local reports of Japanese in the area successfully ambushed a group of up to 30 Japanese in the church there, with none believed to have survived. Another patrol pushed up to Vincke Point at the mouth of the Kwama River, before establishing a base upstream. The area was subsequently found to contain a large number of dead Japanese from previous heavy fighting there.

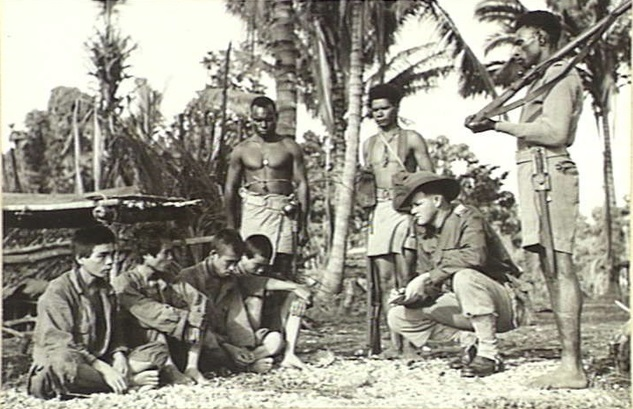
PIB troops and their officer interrogate Japanese prisoners, March 1944

On 25 January A Company Headquarters relocated to Wasu, and from there patrols were sent further along the coast. Heavy contact occurred over this period, with the Papuans killing an average of 12 to 15 Japanese a day. Meanwhile, other patrols flanked the coast through the foothills inland from Sigawara to Ulap Mission. Moving via the villages of Singor and Malsanga, the Papuans arrived at the Timbi River on 30 January. The following day A Company, PIB and the forward Australian units moved forward to Crossingtown. However, with the advance now taking them ahead of their supply system and the arrival of more Australian troops increasing the logistic problem, the Papuans began to run short on food and were placed on reduced rations for a number of days until an airdrop could be organised. On 4 February, 5 Platoon linked up with the rest of A Company at Nemau. The 30th Battalion reached the next supply beach at Butubutu on 5 February. Having led the Australian advance up the coast to this point, the Papuans were then retasked with one platoon conducting a reconnaissance of the inland trails, while the infantry took over the lead on the right. A Company, PIB then moved to the Sowat and Urana Rivers, killing eight Japanese on the way. The Papuans took over the vanguard again ahead the Australians on 7 February, reaching Gali No.1. They were subsequently delayed by a Japanese rearguard between Roinji and Gali; however, this was soon overrun with six of the defenders being killed. On 10 February 1944 the Australians advancing along the coast linked up with American forces at Saidor.

Hitchcock subsequently returned from leave, resuming command of A Company, PIB. On 12 February a patrol south of Gali killed four more Japanese. The following day the Papuans paused while the newly arrived 35th Battalion came forward, before the advance was resumed by the combined Australian and Papuan force. A large Japanese force located at Malamanai was planned to be assaulted by the 35th Battalion while the Papuans guarded their rear. Beginning at 09:00 on 14 February the inexperienced 35th Battalion was outflanked by the Japanese defenders who concentrated heavy fire on the Australians. Ordered to assist the Papuans moved into the bush on both sides of the roads and ambushed the Japanese on the flanks. Following heavy fighting the Australians and Papuans forced the Japanese to withdraw towards Saidor. Beginning on 16 February A Company, PIB supported the Australian effort to push the Japanese out of the hill villages of Ruange, Bwana Nos. 1, 2 and 3, Tapen, Gubutamon, and Wandiluk. By now the Japanese were starving, and many were attracted to the gardens located in the area as sources of food. When cornered they could be expected to defend their positions desperately as a result. During the period to 21 February large numbers of Japanese were killed in the area, including many by A Company, PIB. Private Matpi was later awarded the Distinguished Conduct Medal for his actions.

On 25 February PIB platoons operating in the mountains were order not to advance beyond Wandiluk as its part in the campaign began to come to an end. At Nokopo a PIB patrol chased a number of hungry Japanese out of the village gardens. Elsewhere, American forces captured Los Negros by the end of February, commencing construction of a large base area for further operations at Lorengau. On 3 March 1944 A Company, PIB was withdrawn and moved to the battalion rest camp established at the Song River. A Company had been deployed for over eight months and the conditions of the campaign and the rapid advance had taken a toll on it with a number men evacuated to hospital, while its casualties included one dead. Occupying a position adjacent to C Company, PIB at Kaligia, A Company was complete by 11 March, concluding its involvement in the actions along the Rai Coast. Meanwhile, an Advanced Battalion Headquarters had been established there under Watson following his arrival from Port Moresby, taking over command of A and C Companies.

=== Madang, April – August 1944 ===
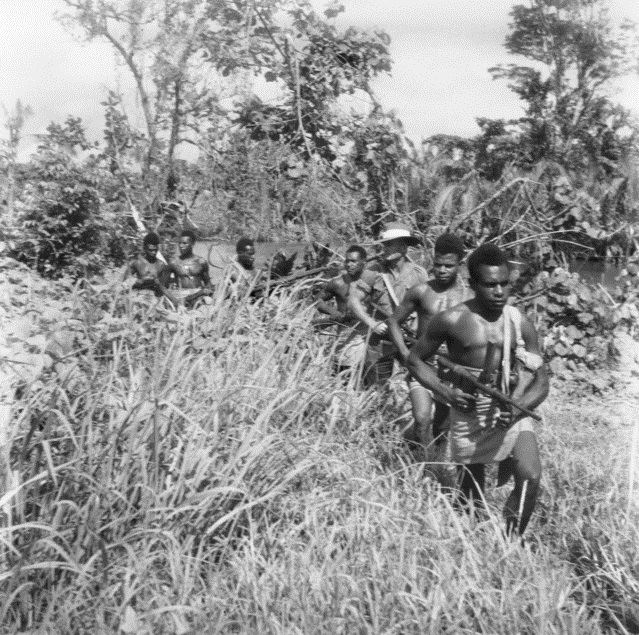
5 Platoon, A Company PIB on patrol, Hansa Bay 1944

As Australian forces continued their advance along the coast, they reached Bogadjim on 13 April 1944, before capturing Madang on the 24th, followed by Alexishafen two days later. The PIB was tasked with moving into the area to the south-west of Madang, with both A and C Companies commencing operations in the area to the east of the Adelbert Range in support of the Australian 5th Division. A Company left the Song River camp on 22 April, flying to Saidor, and then moved by barge to Bogadjim the following day, while C Company moved by sea to Madang on 25 April aboard the destroyer HMAS Vendetta. On 27 April, C Company and the Advanced Battalion Headquarters married up with A Company at Siabob prior to commencing patrols. A Company was allocated an area south to the Amele River Mission where one of its platoons clashed with a small Japanese force, while C Company was to patrol west and south-west to the head of the Amaimon–Gogol River. A Company moved up the coast to Alexishafen on 2 May, and began operating north and west of Madang, with C Company taking over the south west. Advanced Battalion Headquarters was closed down on 9 May, and its personnel transferred to A and C Company. C Company spent the remainder of the month of May undertaking uneventful patrols around Amele.

In the first week of June, A Company extended its patrols inland to Nagada and Sarang, while a section was detached to a company from the 37th/52nd Battalion operating on Kar Kar Island. C Company patrolled to Sanapi, extending its patrols west of Madang, while A Company moved up the coast to Dugumr Bay, reaching Bogia on 13 June. Moving further along the coast to Moresapa, company headquarters was established at Hansa Bay on the 16th. It was then tasked with patrolling the coastal region between the Ramu and Sepik Rivers. During these patrols the Papuans rescued eight survivors from a crashed US bomber, while a number of Chinese civilians, escaped Indian prisoners of war, and sick Japanese were also recovered, while several Japanese ambushed and killed in a minor clash. In June, a crashed C-47 Dakota was found and two of its crew rescued. Meanwhile, C Company undertook little activity in June as they prepared to redeploy. On 1 July 1944, they embarked on the Isaac I. Stevens to return to Port Moresby, followed by onward movement to battalion headquarters located at Bisiatabu.

On 5 July, an A Company patrol in the Watam Lagoon area uncovered intelligence regarding a Japanese force approximately 100-strong located at Singarin. The Papuans then undertook a series of probes down the Ramu and Sepik Rivers, with one patrol reaching Schilling Plantation. Information from the local people indicated many of the Japanese were dying or were otherwise in poor condition, being short on food and only lightly armed. On 8 July, another patrol moved towards Bien village on the Sepik. Requiring canoes to travel down to the river mouth one of the patrols attempted to obtain them from nearby villages but was betrayed in fear of retribution. That evening their position was surrounded by Japanese. At dawn on 9 July around 20 Japanese supported by 30 armed Sepik villagers landed undetected and attacked the Papuan camp. A number of Papuans were alerted and returned fire, while those sleeping in the houses escaped into the swamp. After several hours the patrol re-assembled at Bien, and although a number of weapons had been lost, there were no casualties. The Japanese occupied the village but did not pursue the men in the swamp who eventually linked up and made their way through a maze of swamp and jungle, reaching a small village by the afternoon where they rested after coming 16 kilometres (10 mi) through difficult terrain. The next day they reached the mouth of the Sepik, and later rejoined the rest of the party. Meanwhile, a section at Watam patrolled near the mouth of the Sepik, observing Japanese movements around Kopra Bank. A Company continued its patrols until 8 August, after which it was withdrawn to Alexishafen. They returned to Port Moresby on 28 August 1944. B Company then became the only PIB element in the area, being based on the Ramu River between Dumpu and Annenberg, until relieved by a newly raised New Guinean unit on 28 November 1944.

=== Formation of additional native units ===
In the latter half of 1943 the Australian government decided, with MacArthur's agreement, that the size of the military would be decreased to release manpower for war-related industries required to supply growing British and US forces in the Pacific. The size of the Army was reduced, though an offensive force of six infantry divisions (three AIF and three Militia) was maintained until the end of the war. In early 1944 all but two of the Army's divisions had been withdrawn to the Atherton Tableland for training and rehabilitation. The Australian military's role in the South-West Pacific subsequently decreased during 1944 as US forces took over responsibility for the main Allied effort in the region. Meanwhile, as a result of the success of the PIB, in late 1943 New Guinea Force Headquarters decided to raise units of indigenous soldiers in New Guinea to bolster the forces available to it. The 1st New Guinea Infantry Battalion (1 NGIB) was formed in March 1944, while the 2nd New Guinea Infantry Battalion (2 NGIB) was formed on 26 September 1944. Yet as manpower reductions continued these losses would be partly offset by raising more battalions of New Guinea natives, with plans to raise another four in the next 12 months. These troops had earlier seen action alongside Australian units throughout the New Guinea campaign, and they largely replaced the Australian Army battalions that were disbanded during the year.

In October 1944 it was decided it would be necessary to raise the Pacific Islands Regiment (PIR) to administer the three battalions of Papuan and New Guinean troops. Yet the Australian military had held strong misgivings about the establishment of the PIR, and it had only been undertaken out of necessity, with the effectiveness, discipline and reliability of native troops questioned in some quarters, while training them in the use of weapons was seen as potentially creating a problem for the post-war administration. (Note: These concerns had mirrored those held by prominent settlers before the war, some of whom considered that natives "...might be useful as cheap labour but would run at the first sound of bombardment... and could not be trusted with firearms.") The PIB, along with the 1st and 2nd New Guinea Infantry Battalions, were subsequently amalgamated to form the PIR in November 1944, and a depot battalion formed. The 3rd and 4th New Guinea Infantry Battalion joined the regiment in 1945, although 4 NGIB was soon disbanded, while the 5th New Guinea Infantry Battalion—although authorised—was never raised. Each battalion had an establishment of about 77 Europeans and 550 native soldiers. By the time of the PIB's incorporation into the PIR it had a strength of 700 men. Headquarters PIR was raised on 14 February 1945 at Camp Diddy, near Nadzab. Previously the PIB had been under the administrative control of New Guinea Force, while they fought under local Australian operational commanders; however, ANGAU took over administrative responsibility for the battalion on 24 March 1944. The First Army took over operational control of the new regiment, while ANGAU retained administrative responsibly.

=== Reorganisation, 1944–1945 ===
In February 1944 Watson had transferred a portion of his headquarters to the Song River, due to the distance between Port Moresby and A and C Company. Watson retired from the PIB in April 1944 and was replaced by Standfield, now a lieutenant colonel. With companies operating independently in the Ramu Valley, Madang and Sepik areas his position was mainly administrative. The companies of the battalion returned to Port Moresby between July and November after being temporarily withdrawn from operations, with some of its personnel later being transferred to the New Guinea Infantry Battalions which were in the process of being formed. A reorganisation followed, while the battalion conducted training at Bisiatabu, near Port Moresby. The decision in August 1944 to form 2 NGIB meant the PIB would lose its New Guinean soldiers to 1 and 2 NGIB, although this did not begin to take effect until late October. A total of 162 New Guineans were advised they would be transferred, yet out of loyalty to their battalion many were unhappy with being forced to leave and peacefully left their barracks to protest to ANGAU on 30 October, although without effect. The first 60 New Guineans marched out on 3 November. The Papuans were then allotted to C Company, and those New Guineans that remained were allocated to Depot Company, while recruitment began to rebuild the unit with teams sent to Kila, Boroko, Hanuabada, 12-Mile, 17-Mile, Ilolo, Dobuduru, and Milne Bay in eastern Papua. A number of Australians serving with the PIB were also transferred at this time, either to the NGIB battalions or other units, including Standfield. Lieutenant Colonel Sid Elliot-Smith, a former Resident Magistrate on Samarai Island with the Papuan Administration who had later served with ANGAU, would take over as commanding officer.

The first Australian replacements for the PIB arrived in mid-November, while later that month the last of the New Guineans were ordered to prepare to move to Lae as reinforcements for 1 NGIB. On 12 December 1944, Standfield handed over command to Elliot-Smith. Meanwhile, further Australian replacements arrived in December after completing training with ANGAU. Depot Company, PIB was disbanded at Bisiatabu in January 1945, and D Company raised in its place as a fourth rifle company on the same scale as the other three companies. Depot Battalion, PIR had been established by November 1944, and it subsequently took over this role. At this time the European establishment of each platoon was reduced to just the platoon commander and platoon sergeant, removing the three section sergeants which had previously been provided for. The battalion had built a fine war record, and except for a two-month break, elements of the unit had been in action continuously since the Japanese landing at Buna in July 1942. However, with the transfer of the New Guineans to the NGIB there were barely enough Papuans to man a company, and those that remained were internally posted in equal numbers throughout the battalion in preparation for the arrival of new recruits to fill the vacancies. In the months that followed the strength of the battalion grew, and by April 1945 it was operational again. The PIB was next committed to the Bougainville Campaign, where its companies would be spread across the fronts from Bonis to Buin during the final months of the war.

=== Bougainville, May – September 1945 ===
On 22 November 1944, the Australian II Corps under Lieutenant General Stanley Savige took over responsibility for Allied operations on Bougainville from the US XIV Corps, and throughout November and December Australian units relieved the Americans who were redeployed for subsequent operations in the Philippines. Although Japanese forces on Bougainville numbered around 40,000 men at this stage, Allied intelligence had estimated that there were only about 17,500 defenders on the island. As a result of this error, Australian planning staff believed they were opposed by a roughly equal-sized force and Savige decided he would pursue an aggressive offensive campaign to clear the Japanese from Bougainville. The Australian force consisted of the 3rd Division and two independent brigades, the 11th Brigade and 23rd Brigade. The majority of the Japanese force was believed to be concentrated in the south and as a result the main effort of the Australian plan was focused upon driving towards Buin. Supporting operations were also conducted along two other fronts. In the north, it was planned that the Japanese would be forced into the narrow Bonis Peninsula and contained there while, in the centre, the seizure of Pearl Ridge would give the Australians control of the east–west avenues of approach, as well as affording them protection against further counter-attacks and opening the way for a drive to the east coast.

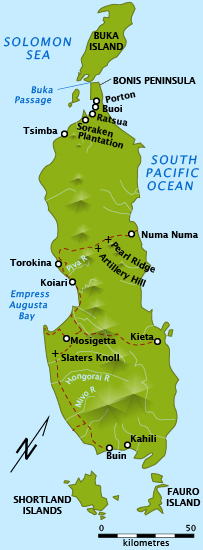
Some key locations in the Bougainville campaign.

With the campaign continuing the PIB was committed to the fighting. On 15 May 1945, all four companies embarked at Port Moresby bound for Empress Augusta Bay on the west coast of Bougainville. Arriving on 18 May, they then sailed for Torokina. With the unit substantially rebuilt, for many the coming fighting would be their first experience of combat. PIB involvement in the campaign would again see the companies operating as individually attached to larger units and formations, with the battalion widely dispersed across the area of operations. A Company was tasked to support the 26th Battalion on the Bonis Peninsula in the northern sector, B Company would support the 7th and 27th Battalions in the central sector along the Numa Numa Trail, C Company to Mokolina in the south attached to the 2/8th Commando Squadron operating in the hills east of the Buin Road, while D Company would support the 15th Brigade near Tai Tai, also in the southern sector. Meanwhile, Battalion Headquarters was established on Torokina. With the PIB concentrated on Bougainville, by 1 June 1945 the battalion headquarters was established at McKenna Bridge, in the vicinity of Headquarters 3rd Division. By this time the Australians had gained the ascendency. In the north the 11th Brigade had pushed the Japanese back to the Bonis Peninsula, the 23rd Brigade was in control of the Numa Numa Trail in the central sector, while in the south the lead Australian battalions from the 3rd Division had advanced to within 45 kilometres (28 mi) of Buin, and were threatening the main Japanese garden areas. As Australian strength on Bougainville increased Savige planned the destruction of the Japanese on the island, intending to concentrate his forces in the south for the final advance on Buin, while maintaining sufficient strength in the northern and central sectors to maintain pressure on the defenders.

After landing on 18 May 1945, A Company, under Jesser who was by now a major, moved by barge from Torokina to Soroken Plantation in the northern sector (less 1 and 2 Platoon which remained behind). Attached to the 26th Battalion, the Papuans started patrolling, with 3 and 4 Platoon moving across the narrow peninsula towards Siara, north of Ruri Bay. A number of sharp patrol clashes and ambushes followed during which the Papuans inflicted a large number of casualties on the Japanese. On 3 June, 4 Platoon was patrolling in advance of D Company, 26th Battalion when it was ambushed and its platoon commander killed. By 9 June the platoons were back at Soraken Plantation, while on the 12th a patrol was sent north to Buoi Plantation, 2 miles (3 km) from Ratsua. 5 Platoon subsequently operated with the 31st/51st Battalion on the west coast. On 22 June a reconnaissance patrol moved north to Buoi in an attempt to locate barges used during an unsuccessful attempt Australian attempt to land behind Japanese lines at Porton Plantation, but was forced to withdraw after hitting a strong Japanese position. The next month was mostly a period of rest, although reconnaissance patrols were sent to Ratsua, Tanimbau Bay and Ruru Bay. On 10 July the company established a base area around Ratsua. While 4 and 5 Platoon were tasked with scouting the road west of Ruri Bay. At this time Major Raymond Oliver took over command from Jesser. On 29 July at patrol from 4 Platoon was engaged in heavy fighting with a force of approximately 30 Japanese in a strong defensive position, but was able to conduct a fighting withdrawal supported by 5 Platoon, after losing one man killed. Another heavy clash two days later west of Ruri Bay which saw A Company inflict heavy casualties on a Japanese force of about 20 men, forcing the survivors to flee. On 7 August a patrol from 5 Platoon was tasked with establishing a base on the road south of the junction of the Numa Numa beach roads. Moving south, the Papuans located a camp before clashing with several groups of Japanese, many of whom were killed. The platoon then withdrew without loss in what proved to be A Company's last action on Bougainville.

Meanwhile, in late May 1945, B Company, PIB, under the command of Captain Leo Hunt, relieved troops from 1 NGIB, who had been patrolling continuously in the central sector since the start of the campaign. Operating with the newly arrived 7th Battalion which had been tasked with eliminating the forward Japanese positions as part of the renewed offensive, they faced the remnants of Japanese forces along the Numa Numa Trail and around Sisivie and Ibu on the track to Asitavi Point on the coast. Initially concentrated north of Keenan's Ridge on Arty Hill, over the period 23 May to 3 June a patrol from 7 Platoon was tasked with cutting the Japanese lines of communication on the Numa Numa Trail, killing 11 Japanese in a series of patrol clashes and ambushes over a 12-day period. A patrol from 8 Platoon departed on 8 June, rejoining the company which was now located on Hunt's Hill on the 15th after an uneventful patrol. From there B Company patrolled the rear of Wearne's Hill and the Numa Numa Trail. On 2 July, 7 Platoon clashed with a group of Japanese while patrolling around Wearne's Hill, killing 5 Japanese before calling down artillery as they withdrew. After a period of rest patrols began again on 22 July, with a clearing patrol from 8 Platoon locating two Japanese listening posts, killing seven. The following day 8 Platoon began a nine-day patrol, leaving Hunt Hill and establishing a base near Tokoa with D Company, 7th Battalion. Following up reports of Japanese in the area, 8 Platoon patrolled to Nasisipok on 24 July. Locating a Japanese position the Papuans killed nine before the platoon was forced to retire under heavy fire which wounded the platoon commander. Returning three days later the Japanese position was found to be deserted. During heavy fighting on Kaipu Ridge on 28 July, a PIB section was attached to an Australian platoon which moved behind the ridge to cut the line of communication of the small but well established Japanese force, which was finally overrun that afternoon by the infantry after a heavy artillery preparation. On 8 August, 6 and 8 Platoon patrolled behind Pearl Ridge to the Wakunai River, ambushing a Japanese water point and killing four. B Company, PIB was then withdrawn to Torokina.

In the southern sector, as the Australian infantry advanced towards Buin supported by tanks and engineers, the 2/8th Commando Squadron had been operating in the mountains on the flank. Acting independently, the Squadron was later joined by soldiers from C Company, PIB commanded by Captain Gordon Smith. In May 1945 they were designated "Raffles Force" under the command of Major Norman Winning; however, operations proved disappointing. Winning was later critical of the performance of the PIB, believing that discipline among the Papuans had been poor due to the limited number of European platoon commanders and sergeants who also lacked combat experience and were not yet used to working with native soldiers, while the Papuans had also seemed to be fearful of artillery and would not accompany forward observation officers. There had also been friction and distrust between the Papuans and their Bougainvillean guides, with Winning alleging that the Papuans had secretly threatened the guides from Buka not to lead them to any difficult targets or into situations from which they could not quickly escape. When the 2/8th Commando Squadron moved to Kilipaijino in July the PIB remained at Morokaimoro in order to patrol the Buin and Commando Roads and operate against Japanese infiltration in the area. On 14 August—the day prior to the cessation of hostilities on Bougainville—a patrol from 11 Platoon moving down the river trail to Hanung, between the Koroko and Mobiai Rivers, was ambushed by a Japanese force of approximately 60 men after being sent to the area to follow up reports of Japanese in the area wishing to surrender. Despite being heavily outnumbered, the Papuans killed 12 Japanese for the loss of one killed and one wounded. Corporal Geai was awarded the Distinguished Conduct Medal.

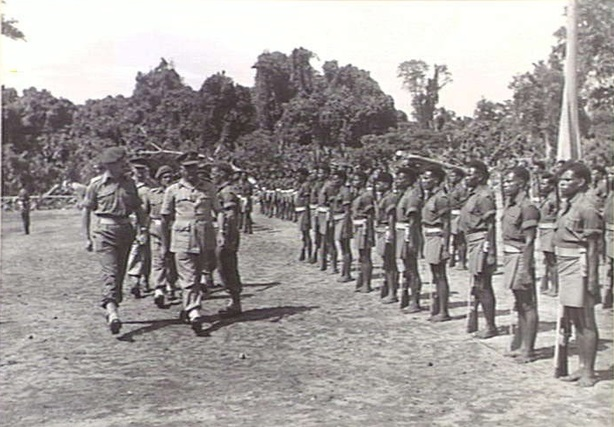
PIB troops being inspected at Torokina, October 1945

Also operating in the southern sector, D Company, PIB under the command of Captain James Flucker, arrived in mid-May and were allocated an area of operations on the northern bank of the Hari River in support of the 15th Brigade. Setting up camp in an area still under heavy fire from the Japanese around Ruani, several Papuans were wounded before operations began. D Company was initially tasked with probing the defences near Anderson's Crossing, during which a patrol clashed with a Japanese squad, killing seven. On 26 May the company moved forward to the Hongorai River. Soon after two Papuans were wounded in an ambush, while another was killed by a booby trap. On 12 June, during a patrol along the Hongorai–Taiati track, 12 Platoon observed a group of Japanese preparing a covering position, killing two, wounding one, and forcing the rest withdraw. Meanwhile, another patrol surprised a Japanese listening post south of the Mamagota–Buin Road junction, killing three. By 18 June, the company was concentrated at Rusei, and began probing east along the Buin Road. On 25 June a patrol from 12 Platoon detected a group of Japanese building a bunker, and killed two after pursuing them through the bush. However, with the rains commencing, the swollen creeks and rivers in the area limited operations, with D Company resting in a position north of the Mivo River during this time. On 14 July a patrol operated with elements of the 42nd Battalion to establish a base 1.6 kilometres (1 mi) east. Departing on 19 July, another patrol located a missing Australian patrol cut-off by the Japanese and the flooding Mivo. Several wounded Australians were helped across the river that evening, while the remainder were led out the next day with the Papuans killing four Japanese and wounding another. On 27 July, a patrol from 12 Platoon east of the Mivo located a Japanese ambush, killing five. On 1 August, another 12 Platoon patrol attacked a Japanese camp near the Mivo River, killing several defenders and forcing the rest to withdraw. On 3 August, a patrol from D Company killed 12 Japanese in an ambush east of the Mivo crossing on the Buin Road. On 9 August, 12 Platoon was involved in the company's last action of the campaign, killing 14 when they surprised a Japanese patrol west on the Aku–Shishigatero track.

By mid-August, following the dropping of two atomic bombs on Hiroshima and Nagasaki and Japan's subsequent unconditional surrender, a cease-fire was ordered on the island and although there were minor clashes following this, it spelt an end to major combat operations. Although in many parts of the island Japanese forces had been ravaged by deprivation, in places where they were still healthy and held strong positions they maintained formidable resistance. Recognised for their skills in the jungle, the Papuans, like the New Guineans elsewhere, had been used in reconnaissance patrols prior to attacks or to locate positions suitable for use by artillery forward observers. Yet at times there had been friction and distrust between the Australian and the Papuan troops. According to Regan and Griffin, during the campaign native soldiers were sometimes used to complete dangerous tasks that Australians had been reluctant to do, while PIB soldiers and their officers also expressed anger at Australian units not acting on their reports, resulting in them having to repeatedly reconnoitre the same area. Some Australian units also reported that on occasion Papuan or New Guinean guides had deliberately led them away from Japanese positions. PIB casualties during the fighting on Bougainville were six killed and 29 wounded, while Japanese losses at their hands were estimated at 382 killed, 43 wounded, and 105 captured.

=== Disbandment ===
By the end of the war the PIB had sustained casualties of 32 killed, 15 missing, 42 died and 25 wounded, consisting of 23 Europeans and 91 natives. (Note: These figures are different to those in Sinclair, who lists casualties of 22 Europeans and 98 natives.) Although the number of Papuans that served in the conflict was relatively small in comparison to the Australians or Americans, being used in scouting and patrolling and often attached to far larger formations or in support of Allied intelligence, Sinclair argues that they had filled an important role out of proportion to their size. (Note: When the tens of thousands of Papuans and New Guineans employed as labourers were considered, in addition to those fighting as part of the PIR or RPC, or those employed as guerrillas or locally employed carriers, the Australian official historian, Gavin Long, felt the burden of the war fell more heavily on the native population than it did on that of Australia.) Members of the battalion received the following decorations: one Distinguished Service Order, three Military Crosses, one George Medal, three Distinguished Conduct Medals, 15 Military Medals, and three Mentioned in Despatches. (Note: Figures for awards to members of the PIB are difficult to accurately determine as most sources are incomplete, these figures are from Sinclair. However, neither Sinclair nor Byrnes seem to include a complete list.) The PIB was recorded as having killed 1,476 Japanese soldiers during the operations it was involved in. Such was their effectiveness the Japanese referred to the PIB as "Green Shadows" (Ryokuin) due to their ability to fade into and appear from the jungle unexpectedly, with its soldiers becoming noted for their ferocity and tenacity. Captured documents also referred to the PIB as "Savage Unit" (Yabanjin Tai) or "Savage Soldiers" (Yabanjin Hei). Despite initial disapproval from some prominent settlers prior to the war, the Papuan and New Guinean soldiers also came to be thought of highly by many senior Australian officers who considered them "...fighters skilled in stealth and surprise attack, men whose knowledge of the bush and experience in tribal warfare could advance the Allied cause." Yet military discipline among the native soldiers was reportedly an issue at times, with some men known to have taken advantage of their positions, while there were also cases of rape, looting and theft, particularly when detached or otherwise unsupervised.

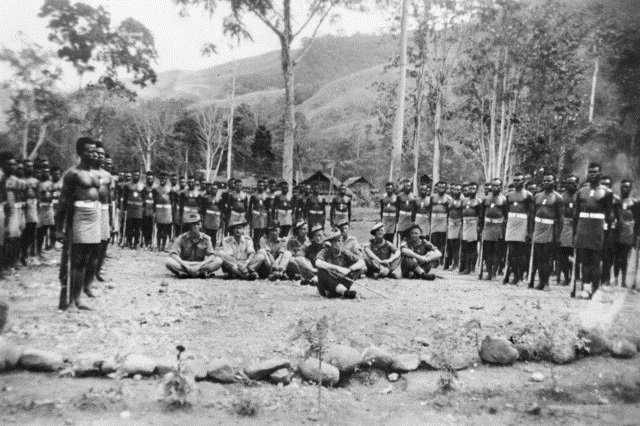
Members of the PIB on parade

On 18 September 1945 the battalion moved to Torokina, before relocating again to Fauro Island in December to guard Japanese prisoners of war. Completing this duty in March 1946 they moved to Blanche Bay, near Rabaul, to guard Japanese prisoners there. The battalion was disbanded in August 1946, with the last members leaving Rabaul on 21 June. The soldiers of the Pacific Islands Regiment mostly went back to their villages and resumed their pre-war lives, although many struggled to readjust to being civilians again. Some expressed resentment at being treated poorly after their wartime service, having expected material rewards and improvements in the quality of life of the native population after the war. Many former soldiers became farmers, while others joined the public service, or came to prominence in local government. Still others joined the Royal Papua and New Guinea Constabulary. Perhaps surprisingly though, relatively few played a part as leaders in the political change which began in Papua New Guinea in 1960s, including the first general elections in 1964. Yet the experience of the war forever altered PNG, helping to change the perceptions of many Papua New Guineans of relations between the races from that which had existed in pre-war colonial society, with many coming to view themselves as the equals of Europeans as a result. This was due at least in part to the attitudes displayed by many Australian and US servicemen during the war which had often been more egalitarian than those of the small resident European population that had generally held itself aloof.

In the years immediately following the war the Australian Army considered re-establishing a military presence in Papua New Guinea, although there was some opposition among the colonial administration and white settlers to the raising of native units, echoing previous concerns. As an interim measure, the re-establishment of the NGVR was approved in July 1949, re-forming as a whites-only reserve unit of the Citizen Military Forces (CMF). However, in November 1950, after considerable debate, the raising of a locally recruited regular battalion was authorised. Consequently, in March 1951 the Pacific Islands Regiment was reformed, with an initial strength of one battalion. Yet due to the age requirements imposed most former members of the wartime regiment were ineligible to re-enlist, and only a few of the youngest members were accepted, although many of those that did later rose to seniority as non-commissioned officers and provided a core of experienced personnel. Drawing its lineage from the PIB and NGIBs, the PIR was awarded their Second World War battle honours in 1961. A second battalion was also authorised, subsequently being raised in 1965. The regiment remained a unit of the Australian Army until Papua New Guinea gained its independence in 1975. Renamed the Royal Pacific Islands Regiment in 1985, today the regiment continues to exist as part of the Papua New Guinea Defence Force.

== Battle honours ==
The PIB was awarded the following battle honours: (Note: The battle honours listed above are those awarded to the PIR in 1961 and include those of both the PIB and NGIB.)

- Second World War: South West Pacific 1942–45, Kokoda Trail, Kokoda–Deniki, Nassau Bay, Tambu Bay, Finschhafen, Scarlet Beach, Liberation of Australian New Guinea, Sio–Sepik River, Kaboibus–Kiarivu and Bonis–Porton.

== Commanding officers ==
The following officers commanded the PIB:

- Major L. Logan (1940–1942)
- Major W.T. Watson (1942–1944)
- Lieutenant Colonel E.A. Standfield (1944)
- Lieutenant Colonel S. Elliott-Smith (1944–1945)

== Notes ==
Footnotes

Citations
