= Chawke =

Chawke is a surname. It is an Irish variant of the English surname Chalke or Chalk. The surname has an established history in the valley of the river Maigue. People with this surname include:

- Charlie Chawke, Irish businessman (owner of pubs); see Drumaville Consortium
- Ned Chawke (1918–1980), Irish hurler
