= Chalke (disambiguation) =

The Chalke Gate was the main ceremonial entrance to the Great Palace of Constantinople in the Byzantine period.

Chalke may also refer to:

== Places ==
- Chalki, an island near Rhodes in Greece
- Heybeliada, one of the Princes' Islands in the Marmara Sea, known as Chalke in Byzantine times

== Other uses ==
- Chalke (surname)
- River Chalke, Wiltshire, England

== See also ==
- Chalk (disambiguation)
