= 4th Infantry =

4th Infantry may refer to:

- 2/4th Battalion (Australia)
- 4th Battalion (Australia)
- 4th Battalion, 3rd Infantry Regiment (United States)
- 4th Battalion, Royal Australian Regiment
- 4th Infantry Division (India)
- 4th Infantry Division (Poland)
- 4th Infantry Division (United Kingdom)
- 4th Infantry Division (United States)
- 4th Infantry Regiment (United States)
- 4th New Guinea Infantry Battalion
- 4th Single Infantry Battalion (Estonia)
- The Loyal Edmonton Regiment (4th Battalion, Princess Patricia's Canadian Light Infantry)
