= Chalk (disambiguation) =

Chalk is a type of sedimentary rock, composed predominantly of calcium carbonate.

Chalk may also refer to:

- The Chalk Group, a stratigraphic unit in northwest Europe.
- The Chalk country, a region of Discworld.
- Blackboard chalk and sidewalk chalk, a material used for writing and art, usually composed of calcium sulfate or calcium carbonate.
- Chalk (band), post-punk industrial dance duo from Belfast, Northern Ireland.
- Chalk (drying agent), magnesium carbonate, used for hands in rock climbing, gymnastics, and weight lifting.
- Chalk, Kent, a village in England.
- Chalk (TV series), a BBC sitcom written by Steven Moffat.
- Chalk (film), a 2006 film by Mike Akel.
- Chalk (military), a group of paratroopers or other soldiers that deploy from a single aircraft.
- Billiard chalk, a silica and corundum compound applied to the tip of a cue.
- French chalk, or talc, magnesium silicate, usually as a powder or in sticks.
- Chalk (surname), a surname from southern England.

== See also ==
- Chal (name)
- Chalke (disambiguation)
- Chalk's International Airlines
