= 3rd New Guinea Infantry Battalion =

Battalion of the Australian Army in World War II

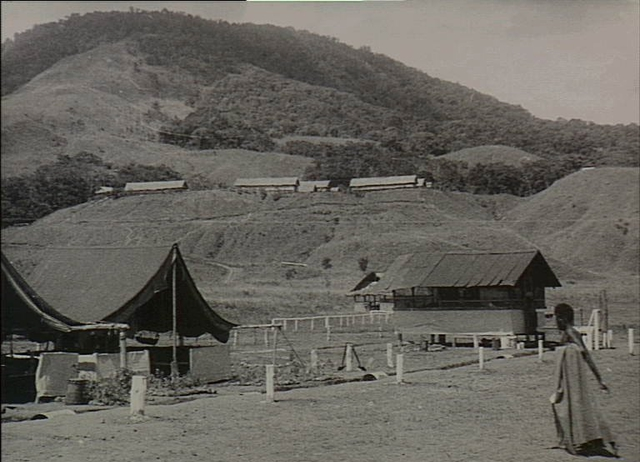
- 3 NGIB's lines at Nadzab, 8 September 1945
- Active: 1945–1947
- Disbanded: November 1947
- Country: Australia
- Allegiance: Allied
- Branch: Army
- Type: Infantry
- Size: Battalion
- Colours: Red and green

Insignia
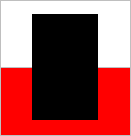
- Unit colour patch

The 3rd New Guinea Infantry Battalion (3 NGIB) was a battalion of the Australian Army during World War II. One of four infantry battalions raised in New Guinea to fight against the Japanese, 3 NGIB was formed in June 1945, and spent the remainder of the war training. After becoming operational, it was sent to New Britain where it undertook garrison duties around Rabaul in the post war period. It later became part of the Pacific Islands Regiment before being disbanded in November 1947.

== History ==
At the start of the war, New Guinea was a former German possession that had become a mandated territory administered by Australia after World War I, and Papua, which been annexed by Queensland in 1883, had been an Australian external territory since 1903. While efforts were made to raise local military forces from indigenous personnel in Papua in the early war years, this did not extend to New Guinea until late in the war. The New Guinea Volunteer Rifles was raised in 1939, but consisted entirely of Australian and European expatriates. The 3rd New Guinea Infantry Battalion was formed in June 1945 in the territory of New Guinea, during World War II, to fight against the Japanese. Its soldiers were primarily natives of New Guinea, under the command of Australian officers and NCOs. The New Guinea battalions each had an establishment of about 77 Europeans and 550 indigenous soldiers. The main role of the New Guinea infantry battalions was to assume responsibility for "mopping up" operations in rear areas and searching for Japanese stragglers left over after main combat operations had ceased; this essentially freed up the Australian infantry battalions for operations elsewhere.

The Papuan Infantry Battalion (PIB) along with the 1st and 2nd New Guinea Infantry Battalions were amalgamated to form the Pacific Islands Regiment in November 1944. The 3rd and 4th New Guinea Infantry Battalions joined the regiment upon their formation in 1945, although 4 NGIB was soon disbanded, and the 5th New Guinea Infantry Battalion—although authorised—was never raised. Established at Camp Diddy, near Nadzab, and drawing personnel from the PIR's depot battalion, 3 NGIB completed training there until August 1945. Formed late in the war the battalion took no part in the Allied campaigns in New Guinea, although a few of its members saw service with 2 NGIB during the Aitape–Wewak campaign, suffering a number of casualties. On the final day of the war, 3 NGIB was declared operationally ready and began moving to New Britain, where it undertook garrison duties around Rabaul in the immediate post war period.

The battalion was disbanded in November 1947. The battalion's casualties amounted to one killed, and six dead from accidental causes or disease. In the post war period, the PIR was re-formed in 1951, building on the tradition established during the war. One battalion was formed in New Guinea at this time, and another in Papua.

== Battle honours ==
3 NGIB received no battle honours as it saw no combat during the war. However, as part of the PIR, it was awarded the following:

- World War II: South West Pacific 1942–1945, Kokoda Trail, Kokoda-Deniki, Nassau Bay, Tambu Bay, Finschhafen, Scarlet Beach, Liberation of Australian New Guinea, Sio-Sepik River, Kaboibus-Kiarivu and Bonis-Porton.

== Commanding officers ==
The following officers commanded the battalion:

- Lieutenant Colonel T.F. MacAdie (1945–1946)
- Lieutenant Colonel A.C. Cameron (1946)
