= Chalke (surname) =

Chalke is a surname. It originates from several places in England named for their association to chalk, such as Broad Chalke or Bower Chalke in Wiltshire, or from any residence on a chalk down.

Notable people with the surname include:

- Alfred Chalke (1878–1966), British fencer
- Herbert Davis Chalke (1897–1979), British physician
- James Chalke, British actor
- Peter Chalke (born 1944), English politician
- Sarah Chalke (born 1976), Canadian actress
- Steve Chalke (born 1955), British minister and activist
- Stephen Chalke (born 1948), English author and publisher

== See also ==
- Chalk (surname)
- Chawke, a surname
