= 2nd New Guinea Infantry Battalion =

Battalion of the Australian Army during World War II

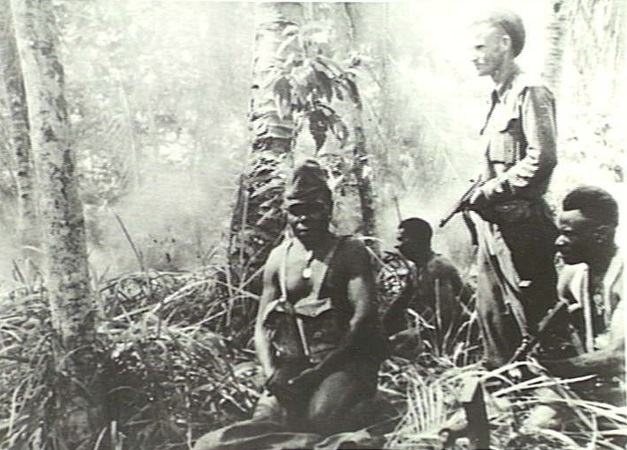
- 'A' Company around Gisanamba, July 1945
- Active: 1944–46
- Disbanded: June 1946
- Country: Australia
- Allegiance: Allied
- Branch: Army
- Type: Infantry
- Size: Battalion
- Colours: Red and green

Insignia
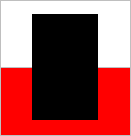
- Unit colour patch

The 2nd New Guinea Infantry Battalion (2 NGIB) was a battalion of the Australian Army during World War II. One of four infantry battalions raised in New Guinea, 2 NGIB was formed in September 1944. Formed late in the war, the battalion played only a minor role in the Allied campaign in New Guinea, supporting the 6th Division during the final stages of the Aitape–Wewak campaign. In 1945, it became part of the Pacific Islands Regiment, but was disbanded in June 1946.

== History ==
Earlier efforts by the Australian Army to raise infantry battalions from local Papuan and New Guinean personnel for service during World War II had resulted in the creation of the Papuan Infantry Battalion (PIB) in 1940. Later, in March 1944 the 1st New Guinea Infantry Battalion had also been raised. These successes had encouraged the Army to raise more such units, and in August 1944 and second New Guinea infantry battalion was authorised. The battalion was formed on 26 September 1944 in the territory of New Guinea, to augment Australian troops fighting against the Japanese. Its soldiers were primarily natives of New Guinea, under the command of Australian officers and NCOs. The PIB along with the 1st and 2nd New Guinea Infantry Battalions were amalgamated to form the Pacific Islands Regiment in November 1944. Several more units were raised later, and the 3rd and 4th New Guinea Infantry Battalion joined the other battalions of the PIR in mid-1945, although 4 NGIB was soon disbanded. A further battalion, the 5th New Guinea Infantry Battalion—although authorised—was never raised.

Upon formation, the battalion generally adopted the same organisation as a standard Australian Army infantry battalion, consisting of four rifle companies, but it lacked several of the usual support platoons including machine guns, mortars and anti-tank; in their stead, the battalion had a signals platoon and a pioneer platoon. The New Guinea battalions each had an establishment of about 77 Europeans and 550 native soldiers, although 2 NGIB was slightly above that establishment, with 28 officers and 56 NCOs, all Australians, and 598 New Guineans, many of whom had been transferred from the PIB.

Formed late in the war, the battalion ultimately played only a minor role during the Allied campaigns in New Guinea. After forming at Camp Diddy, near Nadzab, training was undertaken and in early June 1945, the battalion was allocated to the 6th Division to take part in the final stages of the Aitape–Wewak campaign. Wewak had just been captured by the Australians, so 2 NGIB was attached to the 17th Brigade to assist in mopping up operations in the mountains south of the town, arriving on 25 June. Setting out from Hayfield, near the Sepik River, the battalion detached companies to patrol towards Gwalip. The fighting that the battalion undertook during this time proved heavier than expected, with over 25 Japanese being killed in clashes with 2 NGIB for three men killed in the first month alone.

As the battalion entered the Prince Alexander Range, they were employed as a complete battalion, undertaking conventional operations, rather than as smaller components as originally envisaged. In early July, the battalion headquarters moved to Kwimbu, and a company captured Gisanambu in a firefight that killed 10 Japanese. A further 27 Japanese were killed around Dunbit, although the platoon sent to capture it withdrew after sustaining several casualties, including its commander. In the middle of the month, several efforts were made to secure Aoniaru, although these too were checked until 24 July when Allied air attacks forced the remaining Japanese to abandon the position. Battalion headquarters was moved to Gwalip around this time, and the battalion concentrated there prior to capturing Sigora on 27 July. Three days later, a 2 NGIB company attacked Ulama, after a heavy aerial bombardment, and in the heavy fighting that followed 16 Japanese were killed. By 2 August, the battalion had consolidated their position are Sigora, which was to become a base of operations for the 2/7th Battalion. They then continued on towards Mt Irup.

The war was coming to an end by this time and during this phase, large numbers of Japanese prisoners were taken. There were still large numbers of Japanese offering resistance, though, and heavy fighting took place around Miyamboara, in the final days of the war, when a 2 NGIB patrol attempted to enter the village. By mid-August a ceasefire came into effect and the fighting came to an end prior to the official Japanese surrender in Wewak on 13 September 1945. Following the end of the war, the battalion was disbanded in June 1946 as part of the demobilisation process.

== Battle honours ==
- World War II: Liberation of Australian New Guinea, Kaboibus and Kiarivu.

== Commanding officers ==
The following officers commanded the battalion during the war:

- Lieutenant Colonel H.M. Stewart (1944–1945)
- Lieutenant Colonel A.C. Murchison (1945–1946)
- Lieutenant Colonel A.C. Cameron (1946)

== Decorations ==
Members of the battalion received the following decorations:

- 1 George Medals (GM)
- 3 Military Crosses (MC)
- 2 Military Medals (MM)

== Casualties ==
2 NGIB's casualties during the war amounted to:

- 17 killed, 5 died, 31 wounded.
