= 1st New Guinea Infantry Battalion =

Battalion of the Australian Army during World War II

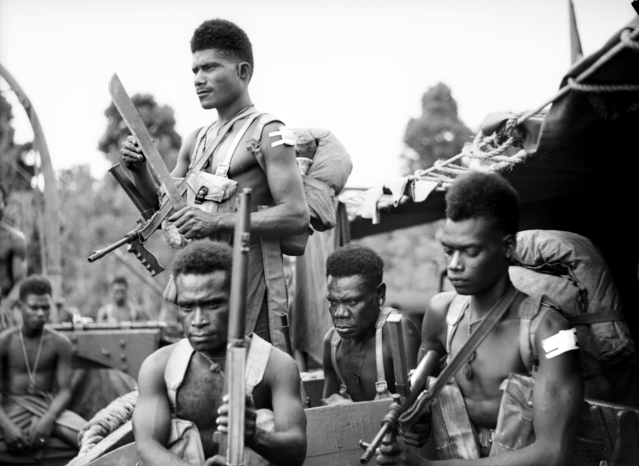
- Troops from the 1st New Guinea Infantry Battalion on a transport ship in November 1944
- Active: 1944–1946
- Disbanded: June 1946
- Country: Australia
- Allegiance: Allied
- Branch: Army
- Type: Infantry
- Size: Battalion
- Colours: Red and green

Insignia
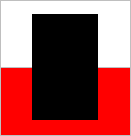
- Unit colour patch

The 1st New Guinea Infantry Battalion (1 NGIB) was a battalion of the Australian Army during World War II. One of four infantry battalions raised in New Guinea, 1 NGIB was formed in March 1944. In late 1944, the battalion began deploying company-sized elements in support of combat operations on Bougainville, New Britain and on mainland New Guinea. It later became part of the Pacific Islands Regiment before being disbanded in June 1946.

== History ==
Earlier efforts by the Australian Army to raise infantry from local Papuan and New Guinean personnel for service against the Japanese during World War II had resulted in the creation of the Papuan Infantry Battalion (PIB) in 1940. This unit had first seen combat in 1942, and as a result of its successes in November 1943 the Australian Army authorised the establishment of another battalion, recruited from New Guinea. This battalion, the 1st New Guinea Infantry Battalion, was formed in March 1944 in the territory of New Guinea. Formed as part of the Australian Army, its soldiers were primarily natives of New Guinea, under the command of Australian officers and NCOs. The New Guinea battalions each had an establishment of about 77 Europeans and 550 native soldiers. Its roles included reconnaissance, harassment and mopping up operations.

Although it was raised late in the war the battalion would ultimately serve in a number of the Allied campaigns in New Guinea, including during the offensives on New Britain and Bougainville. After forming in the Markham Valley, the battalion concentrated at Camp Diddy, located near Nadzab in August 1944, where they were formed into several rifle companies, which were supported by a depot company for training purposes. In November 1944, the PIB along with the 1st and 2nd New Guinea Infantry Battalions were amalgamated to form the Pacific Islands Regiment. Further units would later be raised as the role of New Guinea troops was to be expanded. The 3rd and 4th New Guinea Infantry Battalions joined the Pacific Islands Regiment in 1945, although 4 NGIB was soon disbanded. A further battalion, the 5th New Guinea Infantry Battalion—although authorised—was never raised.

The battalion's operations were devolved down to company level, and in November 1944 the battalion began deploying its companies in support of combat operations. The majority of the battalion was deployed in support of operations on New Britain. 'B' Company deployed there in November, and was joined by 'D' Company the following month. 'B' Company was assigned the southern sector around Jacquinot Bay, patrolling towards Wide Bay in support of the 6th Brigade, while 'D' Company undertook the drive on the northern coast towards Open Bay alongside the 36th Battalion as the Australians established a defensive line between Wide Bay and Open Bay, to confine the Japanese to their base around Rabaul. From March 1945, offensive operations were curtailed and largely focused upon collecting information. Around this time, advanced elements of battalion headquarters moved from Diddy Camp to Rile.

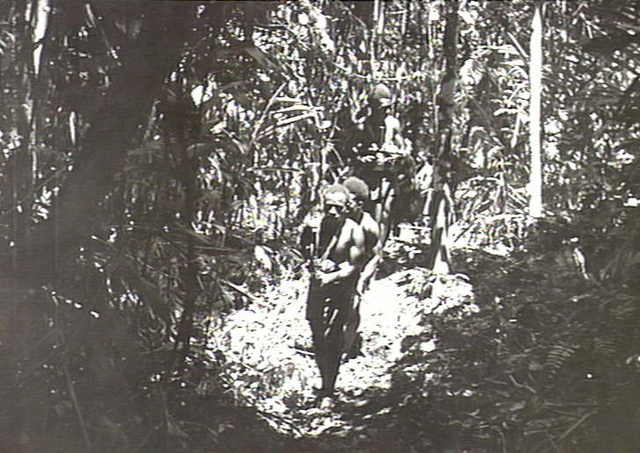
1 NGIB troops patrolling on New Britain, February 1945

Elsewhere, 'A' Company was sent to Bougainville in November 1944, initially concentrating around Cape Torokina. Several platoons were sent to support the 29th Brigade's southern drive towards Buin, carrying out reconnaissance and patrol operations, while another platoon supported the 11th Brigade in the centre of the island along the Numa-Numa trail. As these brigades were in turn rotated to the rear for rest, the platoons continued to support the replacement brigades (the 7th, 15th and 23rd). 1 NGIB troops were involved in numerous small scale skirmishes during the course of the campaign. In December 1944 alone, these patrols killed 41 Japanese and captured eight others in several engagements, while the battalion also detached guides to the Australian infantry battalions, earning a reputation of being able move silently through the bush and locate Japanese patrols and ambushes. Close to the end of the month, a patrol crossed the Adele River to form a base for further operations, and then held off a Japanese attack around the Hupai River, before withdrawing towards Tavera. In late January 1945, a long range patrol was moved by sea to Motupena Point, from where they attacked a Japanese outpost. The following month, a patrol exploited towards Mosigetta. On 29 March 1945, a platoon from 1 NGIB attacked a Japanese camp around Buritsiotorara, killing seven Japanese with machine gun fire and grenades. The next day, the platoon exploited further along the Wakunai River to Aviang, where another three Japanese were killed.

The battalion undertook operations on Bougainville until May 1945, when the PIB relieved 'A' Company, which was subsequently sent to New Britain to join other elements of the battalion. Meanwhile, 'C' Company moved to Salamaua in November 1944, and carried out patrols around Hansa Bay, looking for small pockets of Japanese resistance that had been left behind following the main operation to clear the area, before linking up with the 8th Brigade to patrol around the Sepik River. Detachments were also contributed to the Australian troops holding Annanberg. The area was relatively quiet during this time, although there were some raids by Japanese troops on the forward areas around Marangis. On 19 January 1945, a 1 NGIB patrol attacked a platoon-sized Japanese force around Bosman, killing 22 and capturing a large quantity small arms and a machine gun. Over the period of two months, patrol operations by Australians and New Guineans resulted in 91 Japanese being killed. In March 1945, the company was transferred to Jacquinot Bay on New Britain, travelling from Madang to join the rest of the battalion.

Battalion headquarters main arrived on New Britain in June 1945 and established itself around the Tol Plantation. During this time, the battalion was under the command of the 5th Division, but was later transferred to the 11th Division. Upon their arrival, 'A' Company concentrated around Wide Bay with 'B' Company, while 'C' Company linked up with 'D' Company at the Mavelo Plantation around Open Bay. Operations continued until the fighting came to an end in mid-August 1945. The final months of the battalion's service on New Britain saw some unrest amongst the soldiers over pay and treatment, which later resulted in criticism from the unit's commander about how the troops had been employed on New Britain. Following the end of the war, the demobilisation process began and the battalion disbanded in June 1946.

== Battle honours ==
- World War II: Liberation of Australian New Guinea.

== Commanding officers ==
The following officers commanded the battalion during the war:

- Major William Manning Edwards (1944)
- Lieutenant Colonel Benjamin George Dawson (1944–1945)
- Lieutenant Colonel J.S. Jones (1945)

== Decorations ==
Members of 1 NGIB received the following decorations:

- 3 Military Medals (MM)
- 6 Mentioned in Despatches (MID)

== Casualties ==
The battalion's casualties amounted to:

- 15 killed, 1 missing, 17 died, 25 wounded.
