= Chalk (surname) =

Chalk is a surname. It is a toponymic surname from many places in southern England, most notably Chalk, Kent, but also potentially other places with similar names, or any residence near or on chalky soil or a chalk down.

Notable people with this surname include:

- Alex Chalk (born 1976), British politician
- Alfred Chalk (1874–1954), British railway clerk and soccer player
- Charles Chalk (1876–1945), British soccer player
- Chris Chalk (born 1977), American actor
- Christina Chalk, Scottish beauty pageant titleholder
- Cynthia Chalk (1913–2018), Canadian photographer
- Dave Chalk (born 1959), Canadian entrepreneur and media personality
- Dave Chalk (born 1950), American baseball player
- David Graham Forbes Chalk (born 1959), British civil servant
- Garry Chalk (born 1952), English-born Canadian actor
- Gary Chalk (born 1952), English illustrator and model-maker
- Gerry Chalk (1910–1943), English cricket player and military aviator
- Gordon Chalk (1913–1991), Australian politician
- John Chalk (1916–2001), Australian military officer
- Marshall Chalk (born 1981), Australian rugby player
- Martyn Chalk (born 1969), English soccer player
- Mary Laura Chalk Rowles (1904–1996), Canadian physicist
- Norman Chalk (1916–2005), English soccer player
- O. Roy Chalk (1907–1995), British-born American businessman
- Robin Chalk, English actor
- Roger Chalk, Australian politician
- Warren Chalk (1927–1988), English architect

== See also ==
- Chalke (surname)
- Chalk Beeson (1848–1912), American businessman
- Chawke, a surname
