= Alfred Chalke =

British fencer

Personal information
- Born: 21 December 1878
- Died: 10 May 1966 (aged 87)

Sport
- Sport: Fencing

Alfred Chalke (21 December 1878 – 10 May 1966) was a British fencer. He competed in the individual sabre event at the 1908 Summer Olympics.
