= Ned Chawke =

Irish hurler (1918–1980)

Edward Chawke (9 May 1918 – 26 December 1980) was an Irish hurler. At club level he played for Granagh, winning a Limerick Junior Championship title in 1942, and was right corner-forward on the Limerick senior hurling team that won the 1940 All-Ireland Championship.
