= John Chalk =

Australian Army officer

Captain John Anderson Chalk
- Born: 22 July 1916; Brisbane, Queensland, Australia
- Died: 21 March 2001 (aged 84); Gold Coast, Queensland, Australia
- Military career
- Allegiance: Australia
- Branch: Army
- Service years: 1940–1945
- Rank: Captain
- Service number: QX42213
- Unit: Papuan Infantry Battalion
- Conflicts: Second World War

Captain John Anderson Chalk (22 July 1916 – 21 March 2001) was an officer of the Papuan Infantry Battalion during the Second World War. He led the first ground attack on Papuan territory against Imperial Japanese forces which had landed at Buna and Gona. Along with 35 or 40 soldiers under his command he led an ambush of 1,000 Japanese troops.

== Early life ==
John Anderson Chalk was born on 22 July 1916 to Elizabeth Anderson and Arthur Pridham Chalk at Brisbane in Queensland, Australia.

== Military career ==
=== Enlistment ===
Chalk enlisted in the Australian Army at Enoggera in Queensland on 27 June 1940.

=== Ambush near Sangara ===
On 22 July 1942, following the Japanese landings, Chalk was moving to occupy the Sangara Mission Station. Approaching on the Gona Road they realised that the Japanese had preceded them. Chalk despatched a night patrol and their reconnaissance confirmed the Japanese were in Sangara.

Chalk sent a runner to appraise their commander, W. T. Watson, of the Japanese presence. The runner returned with a reply, written on cardboard, "You will engage the enemy."

Given the numerical disadvantage Chalk withdrew and set up an ambush on a hill near the road. He later reported:

The Japanese eventually arrived, preceded by native carriers, so I had to hold my fire until the Japanese soldiers came into view. I gave the order to fire and immediately the Japanese swung into action with mortars and 'woodpecker' machine guns.

— John Chalk

The men then withdrew into the jungle and rejoined the main force.

=== Post World War II ===
His service ended on 17 October 1945 with his discharge from the army. At this time he was serving with the Papuan Infantry Battalion with the rank of Captain.

Chalk died in Queensland, Australia in March 2001 at the age of 84.
