= 4th New Guinea Infantry Battalion =

Battalion of the Australian Army during World War II

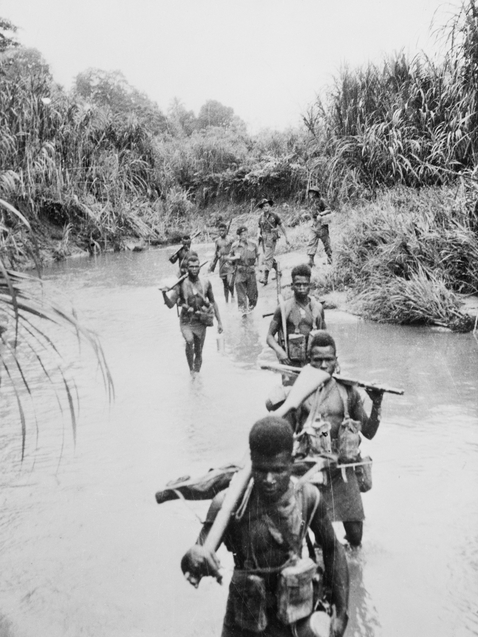
- New Guinea troops on patrol, July 1945
- Active: 1945
- Disbanded: October 1945
- Country: Australia
- Branch: Army
- Type: Infantry
- Size: Battalion
- Colours: Red and green

Insignia
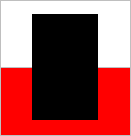
- Unit colour patch

The 4th New Guinea Infantry Battalion (4 NGIB) was a battalion of the Australian Army. One of four infantry battalions raised in New Guinea, 4 NGIB was formed in the final stages of World War II to fight against the Japanese. It eventually became part of the Pacific Islands Regiment, but due to the abrupt ending to the war, the battalion did not see action against the Japanese and was disbanded in October 1945 without seeing active service.

== History ==
At the start of the war, New Guinea was a former German possession that had become a mandated territory administered by Australia after World War I, and Papua, which been annexed by Queensland in 1883, had been an Australian external territory since 1903. While efforts were made to raise local military forces from indigenous personnel in Papua in the early war years, this did not extend to New Guinea until late in the war. The New Guinea Volunteer Rifles was raised in 1939, but consisted entirely of Australian and European expatriates.

The 4th New Guinea Infantry Battalion was formed in August 1945 in the territory of New Guinea, but ultimately it did not complete its formation as it was suspended following the Japanese surrender. Raised to fight against the Japanese, its soldiers were primarily natives of New Guinea, under the command of Australian officers and non commissioned officers (NCOs). The New Guinea battalions each had an establishment of about 77 Europeans and 550 indigenous soldiers. The main role of the New Guinea infantry battalions was to assume responsibility for "mopping up" operations in rear areas and searching for Japanese stragglers left over after main combat operations had ceased; this essentially freed up the Australian infantry battalions for operations elsewhere.

Along with the Papuan Infantry Battalion (PIB), and the 1st, 2nd and 3rd New Guinea Infantry Battalions, 4 NGIB formed part of the Pacific Islands Regiment (PIR), which had originally been formed in November 1944, when the PIB and 1 and 2 NGIB had been amalgamated into the regiment. Another battalion, the 5th New Guinea Infantry Battalion, was also authorised, but was never raised. 4 NGIB was disbanded in October 1945 without having seen active service. In the post war period, the PIR was re-formed in 1951, building on the tradition established during the war. One battalion was formed in New Guinea at this time, and another in Papua.

== Battle honours ==
4 NGIB received no battle honours as it saw no combat during the war. However, as part of the PIR, it was awarded the following:

- World War II: South West Pacific 1942–1945, Kokoda Trail, Kokoda–Deniki, Nassau Bay, Tambu Bay, Finschhafen, Scarlet Beach, Liberation of Australian New Guinea, Sio–Sepik River, Kaboibus–Kiarivu and Bonis–Porton.

== Commanding officers ==
The following officers commanded 4 NGIB:

- Lieutenant Colonel J.S. Jones (1945)
