= Masaweng River =

River in Papua New Guinea

Masaweng River Masawang River
- Location within Papua New Guinea

Location
- Country: Papua New Guinea
- Region: Morobe Province

Physical characteristics
- Source
  - location: Papua New Guinea
- Mouth
  - coordinates: 6°21′11″S 147°48′25″E

The Masaweng River is a river in northern Papua New Guinea.

== See also ==
- List of rivers of Papua New Guinea
- Masaweng River languages
