= Japanese gunboat Keijo Maru =

History

Empire of Japan
- Name: Keijo Maru
- Builder: Uraga Senkyo
- Launched: 12 October 1939
- Acquired: Requisitioned by Imperial Japanese Navy, September 1941
- Fate: Sunk, 21 June 1942

General characteristics
- Tonnage: 2,626 GRT; 1,493 NRT
- Length: 295 ft (89.9 m)
- Beam: 45 ft (13.7 m)
- Depth: 22.75 ft (6.9 m)
- Installed power: 1,400 hp (1,000 kW)
- Propulsion: 1 VTE + low pressure steam turbine

Keijo Maru (Japanese: 京城丸) was an auxiliary gunboat of the Imperial Japanese Navy during World War II.

== History ==
She was laid down as a merchant ship by shipbuilder Uraga Senkyo and launched on 12 October 1939. In September 1941, she was requisitioned by the Imperial Japanese Navy and converted to an auxiliary gunboat, She participated in the Battle of the Coral Sea and the Invasion of Tulagi in May 1942. On 21 June 1942, she was sunk by the submarine USS S-44 at 09°00′S 160°00′E west of the Nggela Islands in the Solomon Islands. 63 crewmen were killed and 62 crewmen were rescued by the Japanese minesweeper W-20.
