= Coral Sea (disambiguation) =

Coral Sea may refer to:

- Coral Sea, a region of the north-east coast of Australia with a namesake chain of islands
- Coral Sea, Queensland, a locality in the Rockhampton Region, Australia
  - Coral Sea Islands Territory, includes a group of small and mostly uninhabited tropical islands and reefs in the Coral Sea

== Entertainment ==
- The Coral Sea (book), by Patti Smith
- The Coral Sea (album), live album by Patti Smith and Kevin Shields
- The Coral Sea (band), a Santa Barbara, California based art rock band led by Rey Villalobos
- The Coral Island, a book by R. M. Ballantyne

== Events ==
- Battle of the Coral Sea (1942), fought between the US and Japan, the first fleet action in which aircraft carriers engaged each other
  - Coral Sea order of battle, list of units that participated in the battle
  - Coral Sea (wargame), a 1974 board wargame that simulates the Battle of the Coral Sea

== Science and technology ==
- Coral sea gregory, a damselfish of the family Pomacentridae, found on coral and rocky reefs in the western Pacific Ocean
- USS Coral Sea, disambiguation; United States Navy ships named for the Battle of the Coral Sea
  - USS Coral Sea (CVE-57), a Casablanca-class escort carrier, later renamed USS Anzio
  - USS Coral Sea (CV-43), a Midway-class aircraft carrier
