= USS S-26 =

S-class submarine of the United States

Coordinates: 8°13′N 79°21′W

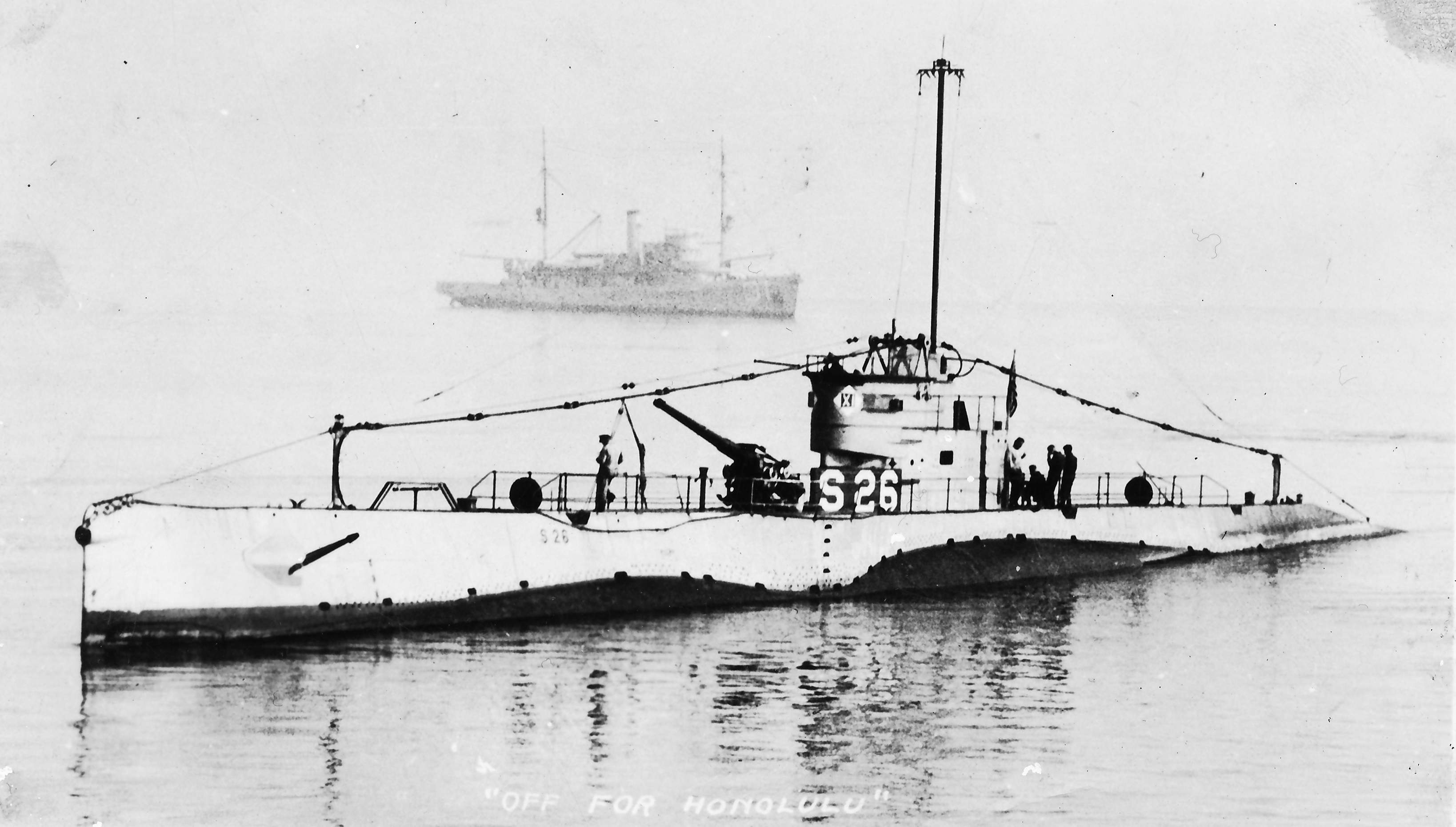
- USS S-26 (SS-131), c. 1927 and 1930, probably at San Diego, California

History

United States
- Name: S-26
- Builder: Fore River Shipyard, Quincy, Massachusetts
- Cost: $677,622.74 (hull and machinery)
- Laid down: 7 November 1919
- Launched: 22 August 1922
- Sponsored by: Mrs. Mary Bean
- Commissioned: 15 October 1923
- Identification: Hull symbol: SS-131; Call sign: NINQ
- Fate: Sunk in collision, 24 January 1942

General characteristics
- Class & type: S-18-class submarine
- Displacement: 930 long tons (945 t) surfaced; 1,094 long tons (1,112 t) submerged
- Length: 219 feet 3 inches (66.83 m)
- Beam: 20 ft 8 in (6.30 m)
- Draft: 17 ft 3 in (5.26 m)
- Installed power: 1,200 brake horsepower (895 kW) diesel; 2,375 hp (1,771 kW) electric
- Propulsion: 2 × NELSECO diesel engines; 2 × Ridgway Dynamo & Engine Company electric motors; 2 × 60-cell batteries; 2 × Propellers
- Speed: 14.5 knots (26.9 km/h; 16.7 mph) surfaced; 11 kn (20 km/h; 13 mph) submerged
- Range: 3,420 nmi (6,330 km; 3,940 mi) at 6.5 kn (12.0 km/h; 7.5 mph) surfaced; 8,950 nmi (16,580 km; 10,300 mi) at 9.5 kn (17.6 km/h; 10.9 mph) surfaced with fuel in main ballast tanks; 20 hours at 5 knots (9 km/h; 6 mph) submerged
- Test depth: 200 ft (61 m)
- Capacity: 41,921 US gallons (158,690 L; 34,907 imp gal) fuel oil
- Complement: 4 officers; 34 enlisted
- Armament: 4 × 21-inch (533 mm) torpedo tubes (12 torpedoes); 1 × 4-inch (102 mm)/50-caliber

USS S-26 (SS-131) was an S-18-class submarine, also referred to as an S-1-class or "Holland"-type, of the United States Navy. She was lost in a collision with a friendly escort ship, PC-460, at night in late January 1942, when both vessels were operating without navigation lights to avoid detection by enemy forces.

== Design ==
The S-18-class had a length of 219 feet 3 inches (66.8 m) overall, a beam of 20 ft 8 in (6.3 m), and a mean draft of 17 ft 3 in (5.3 m). They displaced 930 long tons (940 t) on the surface and 1,094 long tons (1,112 t) submerged. All S-class submarines had a crew of 4 officers and 34 enlisted men, when first commissioned. They had a diving depth of 200 ft (61.0 m).

For surface running, the S-18-class were powered by two 600-brake-horsepower (447 kW) NELSECO diesel engines, each driving one propeller shaft. When submerged each propeller was driven by a 1,175-horsepower (876 kW) Ridgway Dynamo & Engine Company electric motor. They could reach 14.5 knots (26.9 km/h; 16.7 mph) on the surface and 11 kn (20 km/h; 13 mph) underwater.

The boats were armed with four 21-inch (533 mm) torpedo tubes in the bow. They carried eight reloads, for a total of twelve torpedoes. The S-18-class submarines were also armed with a single 4 in (100 mm)/50 caliber deck gun.

== Construction ==
S-26's keel was laid down on 7 November 1919, by the Bethlehem Shipbuilding Corporation's Fore River Shipyard, in Quincy, Massachusetts. She was launched on 22 August 1922, sponsored by Mrs. Mary Bean, and commissioned on 15 October 1923.

== Service history ==
=== 1923–1939 ===
Operating from New London, Connecticut, from 1923 to 1925, S-26 visited St. Thomas, in the United States Virgin Islands, and Trinidad, from January to April 1924, and the Territory of Hawaii, from 27 April to 30 May 1925.

Cruising from California ports, mainly Mare Island, San Diego, and San Pedro, S-26 served in the Panama Canal area, from March to May 1927, visited Hawaii, again during the summers of 1927 to 1928, again served in the Panama Canal area, in February 1929, and made visits to Hawaii, during the summers of 1929 and 1930.

S-26 departed San Diego, on 1 December 1930, and arrived at Pearl Harbor, Hawaii, on 12 December 1930. She then served at Pearl Harbor, until 15 October 1938, when she departed to return to New London. She arrived at on 25 March 1939, and entered a period "in commission in reserve", with a partial crew, there on 15 April 1939.

=== 1940–1942 ===
She resumed full duty on 1 July 1940. She then performed duty at New London, and hydrogen tests at Washington, D.C.

After the United States entered World War II, with the Japanese attack on Pearl Harbor of 7 December 1941, S-26 departed New London, on 10 December 1941, and arrived at Coco Solo, in the Panama Canal Zone, on 19 December 1941.

==== Loss ====
On the night of 24 January 1942, S-26 departed the harbor at Balboa, Panama, to begin her second war patrol as part of a division that also included the submarines S-21, S-29, and S-44, under escort by the submarine chaser PC-460). All four submarines were on the surface, and all five vessels operated without navigation lights to reduce the chance of detection by enemy forces, with PC-460 steaming 1,500 yards (1,370 m) ahead of the leading submarine, S-21. After the vessels were at sea in the Gulf of Panama, PC-460 made a visual signal at 22:10, to the submarines, that she intended to make a wide, 180-degree turn to starboard to return to port and that they could proceed with their assigned duties. Only S-21 received the message. PC-460 then executed her turn, and shortly thereafter encountered S-26, which was running 2,000 yards (1,830 m) behind S-21. The two darkened vessels sighted each other at close range. PC-460 put her engines full astern, but this caused them to fail. Both vessels took evasive action to avoid a collision and PC-460 rammed S-26 amidships on her starboard side at 22:23. The impact tore a large hole in S-26's side and caused her to roll, throwing three of the four men on her bridge overboard. S-26 sank by the bow in less than a minute in 300 ft (91 m) of water about 14 nmi (26 km; 16 mi) west of San Jose Light.

S-26's only survivors were the three men, her commanding officer, executive officer, and a lookout, who went overboard from her bridge. The rest of her crew, three officers and 43 crew members, one of whom also had been on her bridge, were killed. Rescue operations began on the morning of 25 January 1942, with divers making 25 dives to the wreck over the following days in the hope of finding men still alive in S-26's hull, but they found no signs of life. S-26's wreck lies upright on the seabed and is a protected war grave.

== Awards ==
- American Defense Service Medal
- American Campaign Medal
- World War II Victory Medal

== See also ==
- List of lost United States submarines

== Bibliography ==
- "Table 21 - Ships on Navy List June 30, 1919". Congressional Serial Set. U.S. Government Printing Office: 770. 1921.
- Friedman, Norman (1995). U.S. Submarines Through 1945: An Illustrated Design History. Annapolis, Maryland: Naval Institute Press. ISBN 1-55750-263-3.
- Priolo, Gary. "S-26 (SS-131)". Navsource.net.
- "S-26". Dictionary of American Naval Fighting Ships. Navy Department, Naval History and Heritage Command. 1 September 2015. This article incorporates text from this source, which is in the public domain.
- Hall, Anne Martin (1925). Ships of the United States navy and their sponsors, 1913-1923.
- "United States Submarine Losses World War II: S-26 (SS 131)". Naval History and Heritage Command. 31 January 2017.
- "Submarine Casualties Booklet". U.S. Naval Submarine School. 1966. Archived from the original on 11 September 2009.
