= USS S-44 =

Submarine of the United States

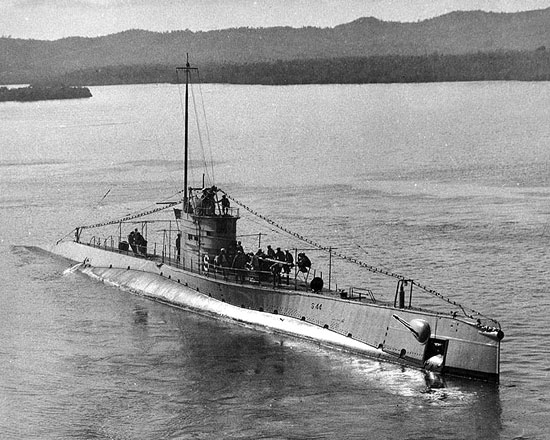
- S-44 in harbor.

History

United States
- Name: USS S-44
- Builder: Bethlehem Shipbuilding Corporation, Quincy, Massachusetts
- Laid down: 19 February 1921
- Launched: 27 October 1923
- Sponsored by: Mrs. H. E. Grieshaber
- Commissioned: 16 February 1925
- Fate: Sunk by the Japanese escort Ishigaki, 7 October 1943

General characteristics
- Class & type: S-class submarine
- Displacement: 850 long tons (864 t) surfaced; 1,126 long tons (1,144 t) submerged
- Length: 225 ft 3 in (68.66 m)
- Beam: 20 ft 8 in (6.30 m)
- Draft: 16 ft (4.9 m)
- Propulsion: 1,200 hp (890 kW) NLSE diesels; 1,500 hp (1,100 kW) Electro Dynamic electric motors (two shafts)
- Speed: 14.5 knots (16.7 mph; 26.9 km/h) surfaced; 11 knots (13 mph; 20 km/h) submerged
- Range: 185 tons oil fuel; 120-cell Exide battery
- Complement: 42 officers and men
- Armament: 1 × 4 in (102 mm)/50 deck gun; 4 × 21 inch (533 mm) torpedo tubes (bow, 12 Mark 10 torpedoes)

Service record
- Operations: World War II
- Awards: 2 battle stars

USS S-44 (SS-155) was a third-group (S-42) S-class submarine of the United States Navy.

== Construction and commissioning ==
S-44′s keel was laid down on 19 February 1921 by the Bethlehem Shipbuilding Corporation's Fore River Shipyard in Quincy, Massachusetts. She was launched on 27 October 1923, sponsored by Mrs. H. E. Grieshaber, and was commissioned on 16 February 1925.

== Service history ==
=== 1924–1941 ===
S-44 operated off the New England coast into the summer of 1925. In late August, she departed New London, Connecticut, for Panama and on 5 September arrived at Coco Solo to join Submarine Division (SubDiv) 19. With the division, she conducted training exercises, participated in fleet exercises and joint Army-Navy maneuvers, and made good will visits to various Caribbean and Pacific, Latin American ports until the spring of 1927. From that time to December 1930, she operated out of San Diego with her division, interrupting exercises off southern California twice for fleet problems in Hawaiian waters.

In December 1930, the S-boat was transferred to Hawaii where her division, now SubDiv 11, was home ported for four years. The boats then returned to San Diego, California and in 1937 were shifted back to Coco Solo.

=== World War II ===
In the spring of 1941, as American involvement in World War II increased, the Panama S-boats were ordered back to the east coast for overhaul. With sister ships S-42 and S-46, S-44 proceeded to New London, Connecticut, and in November went to Philadelphia, where the work was completed.

Trials took S-44 into the new year, and on 7 January 1942, she got underway for Panama. Arriving on 16 January, she departed Balboa on 24 January with S-21, S-26, and S-28, to conduct a security patrol in the western approaches to the canal. Within a few hours, however, she was engaged in rescue operations for S-26, which had been rammed and sunk by submarine chaser PC-460.

==== First patrol, March 1942 ====
From Panama, the division (now SubDiv 53) was ordered to the southwest Pacific. Starting across the Pacific in early March, the boats reached Brisbane in mid-April, and within ten days, S-44 was on her first war patrol. She cleared Moreton Bay on 24 April. Three days later, her port engine went out of commission, but 36 hours of hard work and ingenuity put it back in operation. On 29 April, she began running submerged during the day and surfacing at night to recharge batteries and allow fresh air into the non-air-conditioned boat. By 2 May, she was in her patrol area, New Britain-New Ireland waters. Six days later, she sighted a ship through a haze of rain and launched two torpedoes which missed. She attempted to close the range. However the surface ship easily outdistanced her. The next afternoon, she attempted to close on a Japanese destroyer, east of Adler Bay, but again was easily outrun. On 10 May, off Cape St. George, she closed on another target but was sighted and attacked.

In late afternoon of 12 May, 15 miles (24 km) from the cape, she encountered a merchantman and a trawler escort. For the first time, the weather, her position, and the target's course were all in her favor. She launched four torpedoes while surfaced and hit with two. She then submerged. Shoei Maru, a salvage vessel of over 5,000 tons was sunk. The Japanese escort attacked S-44 and dropped sixteen or more depth charges, none of which was close. On 14 May, S-44 headed home, arriving at Brisbane on 23 May.

==== 2nd patrol, June 1942 ====
Another overhaul followed, and on 7 June she left of Moreton Bay on a course for the Solomon Islands. Within the week, she was on patrol off Guadalcanal, operating from there to Savo and Florida Island. A few days later, she shifted south of Guadalcanal and on 21 June sank the converted gunboat Keijo Maru. At 14:15, S-44 fired her torpedoes. Just three minutes later the enemy aircraft dropped a bomb which exploded close to the submarine, bending the holding latch to the conning tower and allowing in 30 gallons of sea water. This damaged the depth gauges, the gyrocompass, and the ice machine, besides causing leaks. The number-one periscope was thought to be damaged; but when the submarine surfaced a Japanese seaman's coat was found wrapped around its head.

Three days later, S-44 was in Lunga Roads. On 26 June, poor weather set in and blanketed the area until she turned for home. She departed her patrol area on 29 June and arrived at Moreton Bay on 5 July.

==== 3rd patrol, July 1942 ====
S-44 departed Brisbane on 24 July. Cloudy weather with squalls set in. On 31 July, she commenced patrolling the Rabaul-Tulagi shipping lanes. The next day, she sighted a convoy off Cape St. George, but heavy swells hindered depth control and speed, and prevented her from attacking. From Cape St. George, S-44 moved up the east coast of New Ireland to North Cape and Kavieng, where she waited.

On 7 August, the American offensive opened with landing of the 1st Marine Division on the beaches of the Solomon Islands of Guadalcanal and Tulagi. On 9 August, off Savo Island, Cruiser Division 6 of the Imperial Japanese Navy had inflicted one of the worst defeats of the war on American and Australian surface ships.

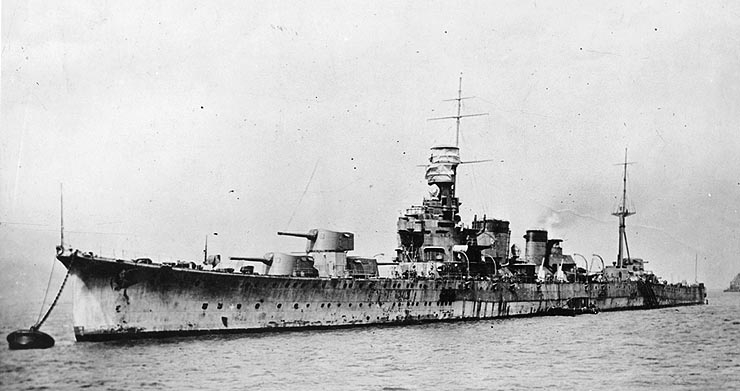
The cruiser Kako

The next morning, the victorious enemy cruisers neared Kavieng, bound for home. At 07:50, S-44 sighted the formation of four heavy cruisers at less than 900 yards (800 m). At 08:06, she fired four Mark 10 torpedoes at the rear ship, only 700 yards (600 m) away. By 08:08, three torpedoes had exploded and the heavy cruiser Kako was sinking. S-44 had claimed the largest Japanese man-of-war in the Pacific War to date.

Three days later, S-44 was again fighting heavy swells. Her damaged bow planes required three hours to rig out, where they were left. On 23 August, she moored at Brisbane. With one ship sunk on each patrol so far, she set a record no other S-boat would match.

==== 4th patrol, September 1942 ====
On 17 September, now in the hands of Reuben Whitaker, S-44 began her fourth war patrol. The following day, a hydrogen fire blazed in her forward battery compartment, but was extinguished in three minutes. On 22 September, she began surfacing only at night, and, two days later, took patrol station off New Georgia to interdict Japan's Faisi-Guadalcanal supply line. During the patrol, her hunting was hindered by Japanese aerial and surface antisubmarine patrols and her own operational capabilities, which were further limited by material defects and damage inflicted during depth chargings.

On the morning of 4 October, she attacked a destroyer, then survived an intensive depth charge attack with seemingly minor damage. When she submerged the next day, however, the submarine began taking water. She surfaced, made repairs, then submerged to 50 feet (15 m). Leaks were found in her motor room and torpedo room flappers. The latter were jacked shut, but the former continued spraying water onto both motors. Within an hour, four Japanese destroyers had moved into the area. S-44 went to 70 feet (21 m). The leak worsened. The motors were covered in canvas and sheet rubber and the crew waited for the destroyers to pass over her position. As they disappeared, S-44 moved up to 55 feet (17 m) and repairs were made on the flapper. That night, further repairs were made while the ship was surfaced off Santa Isabel Island; and, by midnight, the S-boat was en route back to her patrol area. On 7 October, bad weather set in; and, on 8 October, she departed the area, arriving in Moreton Bay on 14 October.

==== Overhaul ====
A month later, S-44 departed Brisbane and headed back to the United States. In early January 1943, she transited the Panama Canal, then moved across the Caribbean Sea and up the Atlantic seaboard to Philadelphia. There, from April to June, she underwent overhaul; and, in July, she retransited the Canal en route to San Diego and the Aleutian Islands.

==== Fifth patrol, September 1943 ====
She arrived at Dutch Harbor on 16 September. On 26 September, she departed Attu on her last war patrol. One day out, while en route to her operating area in the northern Kuril Islands, she was spotted and attacked by a Japanese patrol plane. Suffering no damage, she continued west. On the night of 7 October, she made radar contact with what she thought was a "small merchantman" and closed for a surface attack. Several hundred yards from the target, her deck gun fired and was answered by a salvo. The "small merchantman" in fact was the Shimushu-class escort Ishigaki. An emergency dive was ordered, but the submarine failed to submerge. She then took several hits in the control room, below the waterline in the after battery room, and elsewhere.

S-44 was ordered abandoned. A pillow case was raised from the forward battery room hatch as a flag of surrender, but the Japanese shelling continued. Only two men escaped the sinking vessel. They were taken first to Paramushiro, then to the Naval Interrogation Camp at Ōfuna. The two men spent the last year of World War II working in the Ashio copper mines and survived to be repatriated by the Allies at the end of the war.

== Awards ==
- Navy Unit Commendation
- American Defense Service Medal
- American Campaign Medal
- Asiatic-Pacific Campaign Medal with two battle stars
- World War II Victory Medal
