= USS Sturdy (PC-460) =

Patrol vessel of the United States Navy

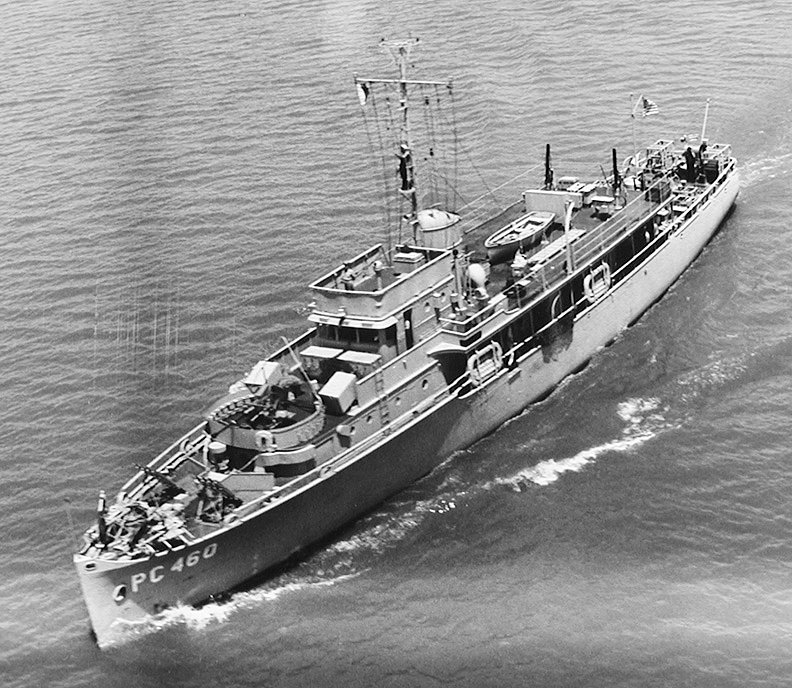

History

United States
- Ordered: as Elda
- Laid down: 1930
- Launched: 1930
- Acquired: 4 September 1940
- Commissioned: 16 October 1940
- Decommissioned: 20 November 1944
- Stricken: 27 November 1944
- Fate: fate unknown

General characteristics
- Displacement: 330 tons
- Length: 154 ft (47 m)
- Beam: 24 ft (7.3 m)
- Draught: 8 ft 6 in (2.59 m)
- Speed: 17 knots

USS Sturdy (PC-460/PYc-50) was a yacht converted to a patrol boat acquired by the U.S. Navy for the task of patrolling the coastal waters of the U.S. East Coast during World War II. Her primary task was to guard the coastal area against German submarines.

The second ship to be named Sturdy by the Navy, ex-Elda was built in 1930 by the Consolidated Shipbuilding Corp., Morris Heights, Bronx, New York. The yacht was purchased from Mr. Arthur Davis of New York City on 4 September 1940 and converted for Navy use by the New York Navy Yard. She was commissioned as PC-460 on 16 October 1940.

== World War II service ==
PC-460 was assigned to the Panama Canal Zone for patrol duty at Balboa and arrived there on 13 November 1940.

On 24 January 1942 in the Gulf of Panama about fourteen miles west of San Jose Light, PC-460 accidentally rammed and sank the submarine USS S-26. PC-460 was escorting USS S-21, USS S-26, USS S-29, and USS S-44 from the harbor of Balboa, Panama to their patrol stations when at 2210 the Sturdy sent a visual message to the submarines that she was leaving the formation and that they could proceed on the duty assigned. S-21 was the only submarine to receive this message. Shortly thereafter, PC-460 struck S-26 on the starboard side of the torpedo room and the submarine sank within a few seconds. Salvage operations started immediately but were not successful.

On 31 January 1943, she sailed to Mobile, Alabama, for extensive repairs after which she returned to Panama.

On 15 July 1943, she was named Sturdy and redesignated PYc-50.

== Retirement ==
Sturdy steamed to Key West, Florida, for repairs and an overhaul in October 1944. She was under repair on the 29th when it was decided that she should be disposed of and all work was ordered stopped. Sturdy was transferred to the 7th Naval District for disposition.

== Decommissioning ==
Sturdy was decommissioned on 20 November 1944 and struck from the Navy list on 27 November 1944.

== Awards ==
- American Defense Service Medal
- American Campaign Medal
- World War II Victory Medal
