= Battle of the Coral Sea order of battle =

IJ Combined Fleet and US Pacific Fleet Commanders

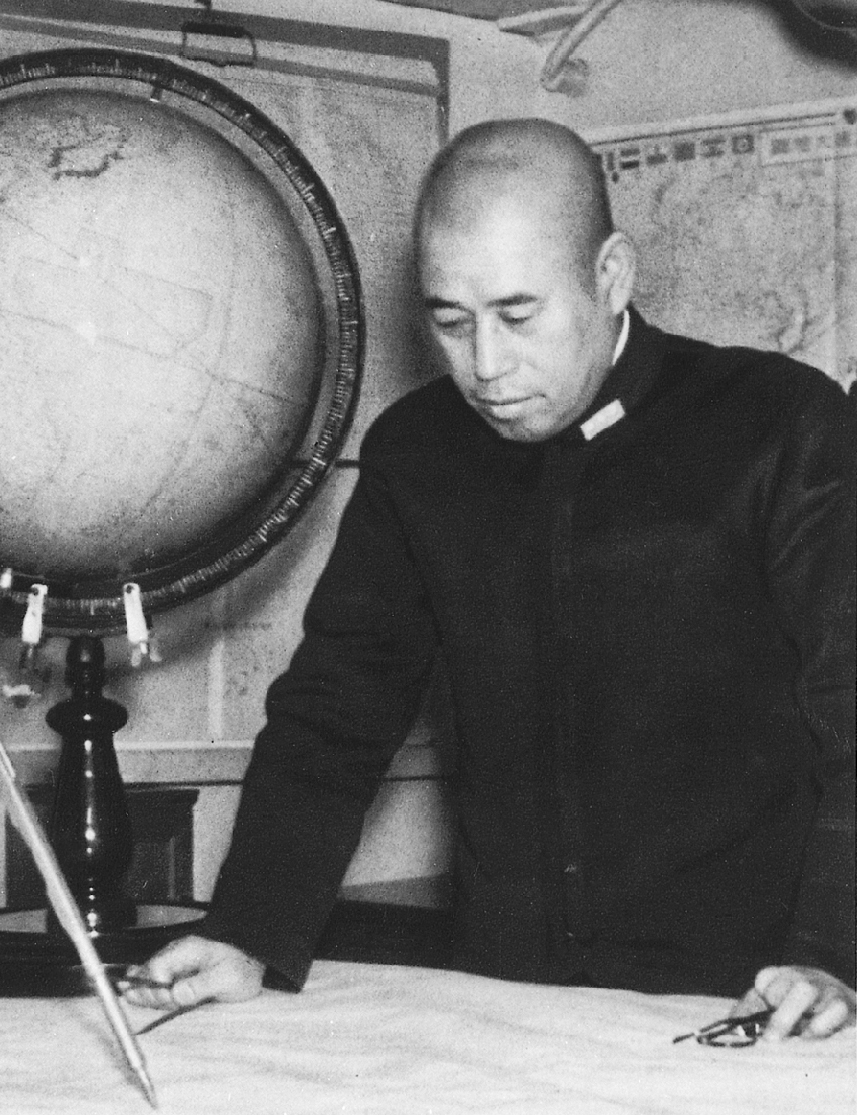
Adm. Isoroku Yamamoto (HQ at Tokyo)

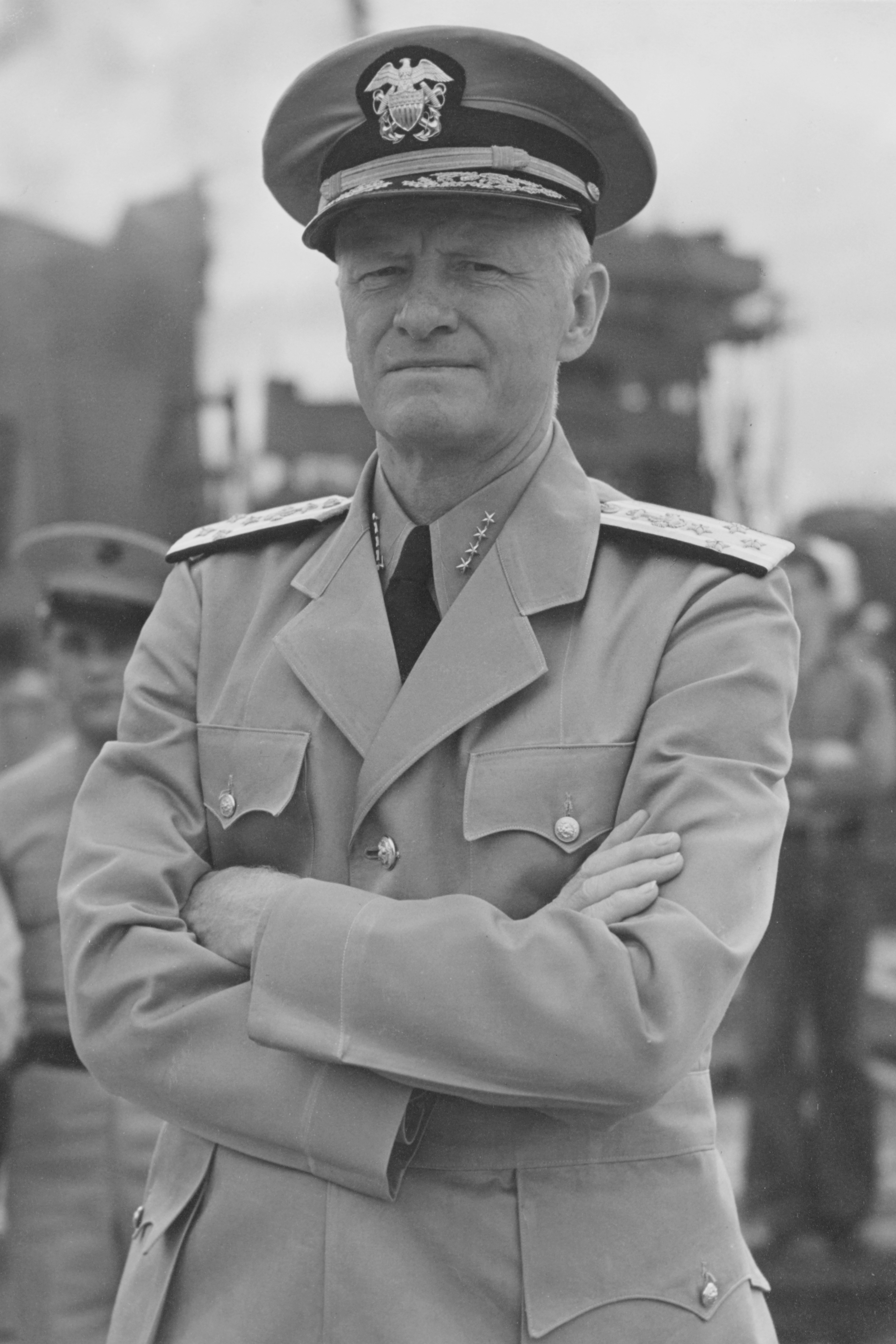
Adm. Chester W. Nimitz (HQ at Pearl Harbor)

The Battle of the Coral Sea, a major engagement of the Pacific Theatre of World War II, was fought 4–8 May 1942 in the waters east of New Guinea and south of the Bismarck Islands between elements of the Imperial Japanese Navy and Allied naval and air forces from the United States (U.S.) and Australia.

To extend their empire in the Pacific to the conquest of Australia, the Japanese first had to capture the naval and air center of Port Moresby on the southeast coast of New Guinea. In order to extend the reach of their air searches for Allied naval forces, they resolved to simultaneously establish a seaplane base at Tulagi in the lower Solomon Islands. The U.S. learned of the Japanese plan, known as Operation Mo, through signals intelligence and sent two United States Navy carrier task forces and a joint Australian-American cruiser force to oppose the Japanese offensive.

The result was a strategic defeat for the Japanese, since their principal goal of landing troops at Port Moresby was thwarted, but a tactical defeat for the Allies, who suffered more significant ship losses.

Because the Japanese assumed the tactical initiative, their forces are listed first.

== Forces deployed ==
Losses in parentheses

Ship Type	(Empire of Japan) IJN	USN	RAN
Fleet carriers (CV)	2	2 (1)	
Light carriers (CVL)	1 (1)		
Heavy cruisers (CA)	4	6	1
Light cruisers (CL)	2		1
Destroyers (DD)	15 (1)	13 (1)	
Amphibious assault vessels	12		
Auxiliaries	26 (3)	3 (1)	

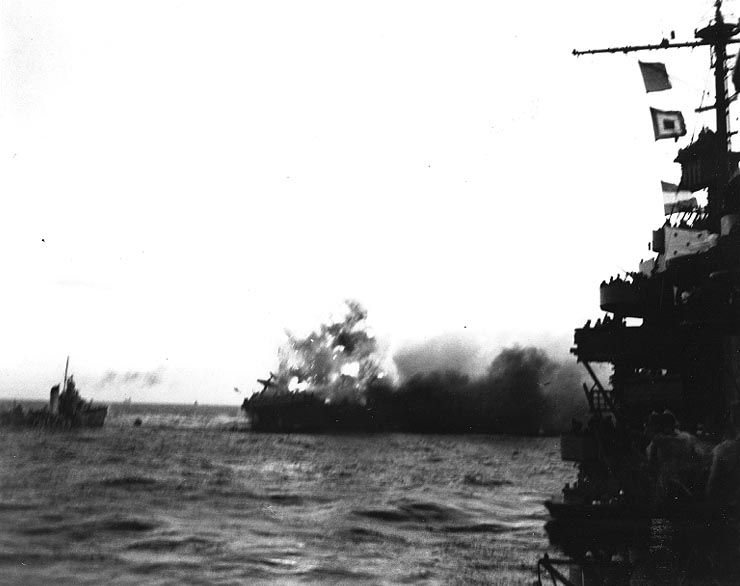
An explosion on the US Navy aircraft carrier Lexington, damaged by a Japanese carrier air attack on 8 May, blows an aircraft off the deck into the sea.

== Japanese Forces ==
Operation and carrier commanders

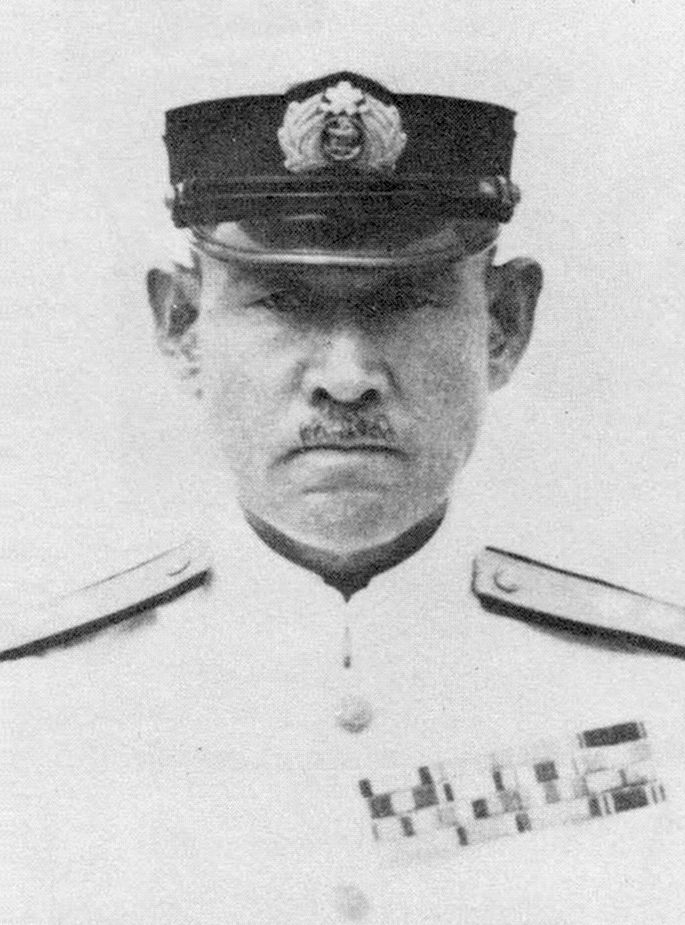
Vice Adm. Shigeyoshi Inoue

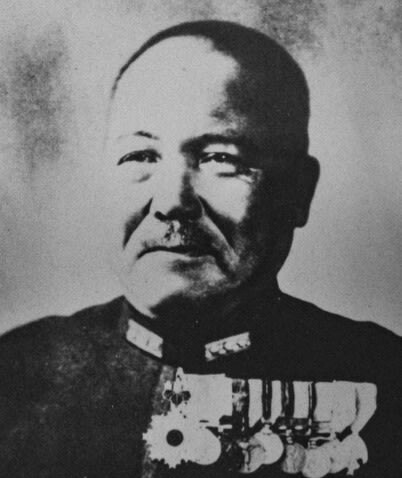
Vice Adm. Takeo Takagi

Task Force MO
Vice Admiral Shigeyoshi Inoue, Commander, Fourth Fleet in light cruiser Kashima anchored at Rabaul

=== Carrier Striking Force ===
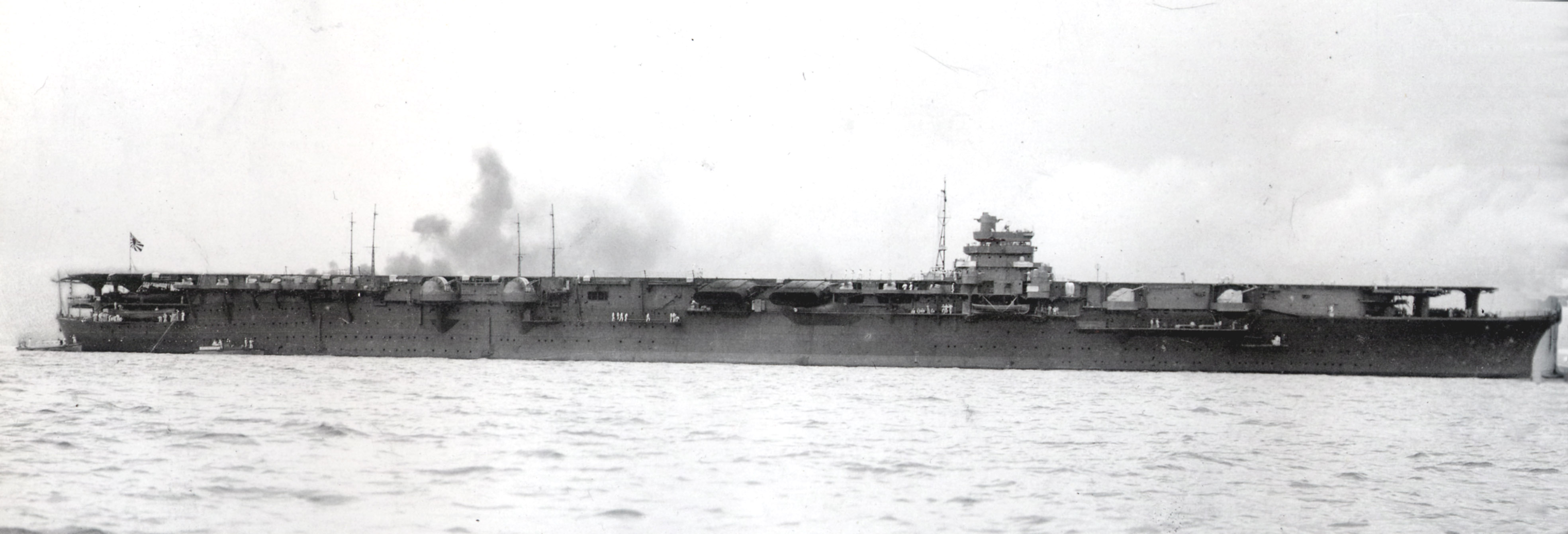
Fleet carrier Shōkaku

Early-war Japanese naval aircraft

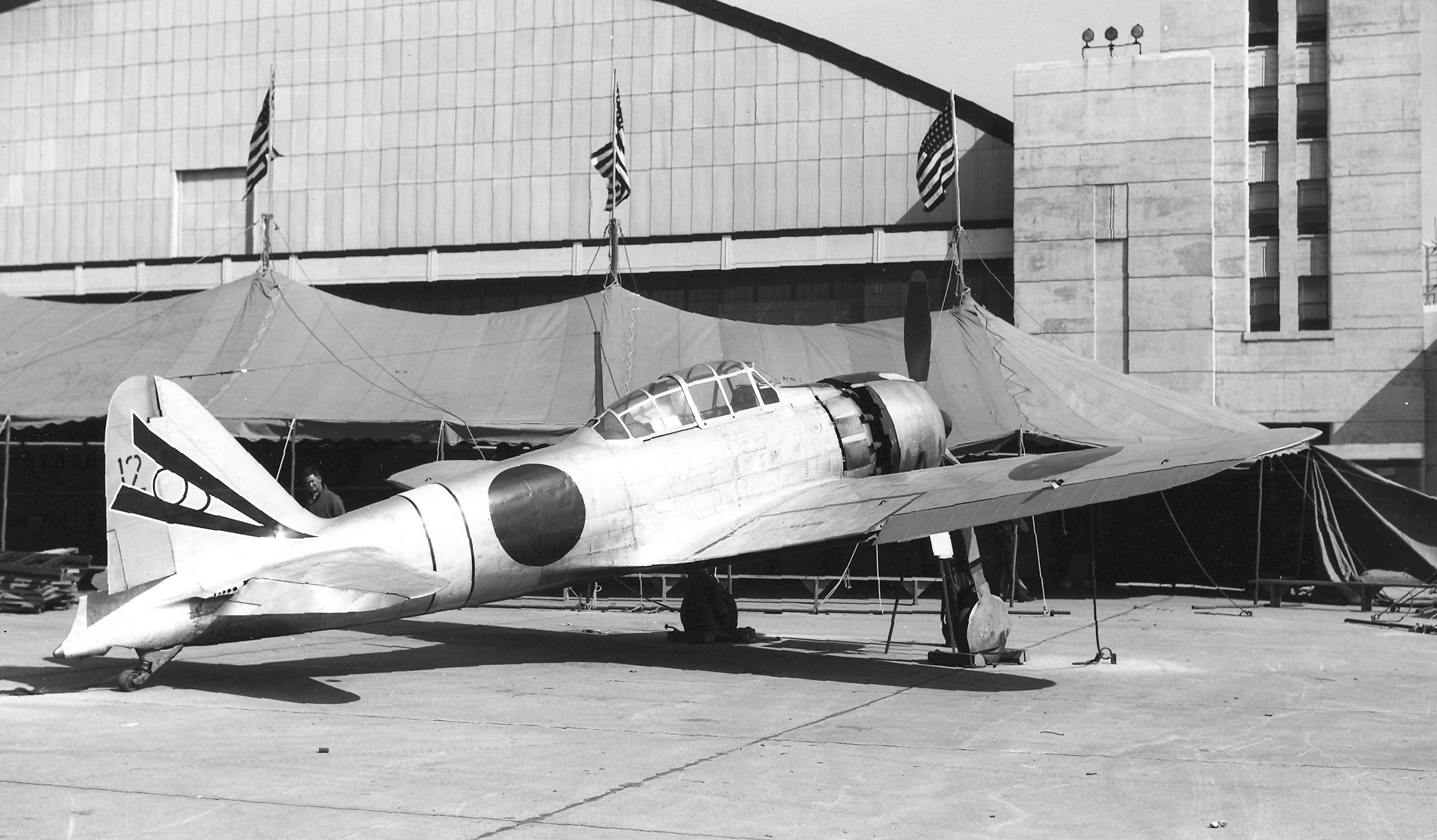
Mitsubishi A6N "Zeke" fighter

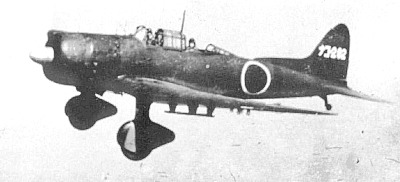
Aichi D3A "Val" dive bomber

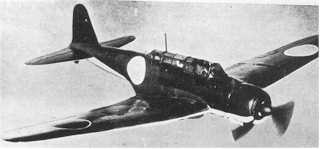
Nakajima B5N "Kate" torpedo bomber

Vice Admiral Takeo Takagi in heavy cruiser Myōkō

5th Carrier Division (Rear Adm. Chūichi Hara, Officer in Tactical Command in Zuikaku)

2 fleet carriers

Shōkaku (Capt. Takatsugu Jōjima)

Air Group (Lt. Cmdr. Kakuichi Takahashi†) (Note: Flew in an Aichi D3A dive bomber.)

21 Mitsubishi A6M "Zeke" fighters (Lt. Takumi Hoashi) (Note: Three aircraft were reserved for delivery to the Tainan Air Group.)
20 Aichi D3A Type 99 "Val" dive bombers (Lt. Masao Yamaguchi)
19 Nakajima B5N Type 97 "Kate" torpedo bombers (Lt. Tatsuo Ichihara)

Zuikaku (Capt. Ichihei Yokogawa)

Air Group (Lt. Cmdr. Shigekazu Shimazaki) (Note: Shimazaki flew in a Nakajima B5N torpedo bomber.)

25 Mitsubishi A6M "Zeke" fighters (Lt. Kiyokuma Okajima) (Note: Five of the fighters were reserved for delivery to the Tainan Air Group.)
22 Aichi D3A "Val" dive bombers (Lt. Tamotsu Ema)
20 Nakajima B5N "Kate" torpedo bombers (Lt. Yoshiaki Tsubota†)

Cruiser Division 5 (Vice Adm. Takagi in Myōkō)

2 heavy cruisers

Both Myoko-class: Myōkō, Haguro (Note: From Cruiser Division 5.)

Destroyer Division 5

2 destroyers

Both Fubuki-class: Ushio, Akebono (Note: From Destroyer Squadron 7.)

Destroyer Division 7

4 destroyers

All Hatsuharu / Shiratsuyu-class: Ariake, Yūgure, Shiratsuyu, Shigure (Note: From Destroyer Squadron 27.)

1 oiler: Tōhō Maru

=== Invasion Forces ===
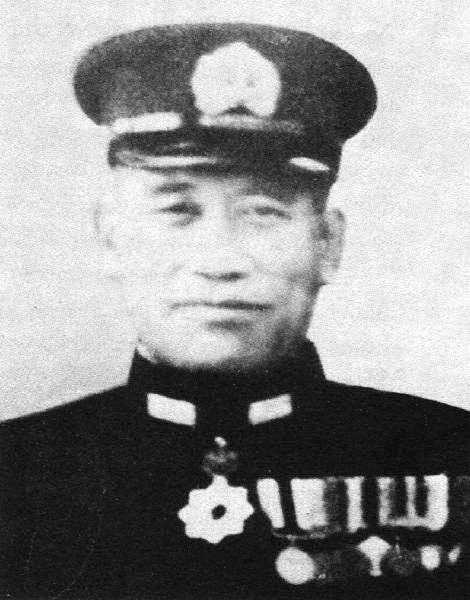
Rear Adm. Aritomo Gotō

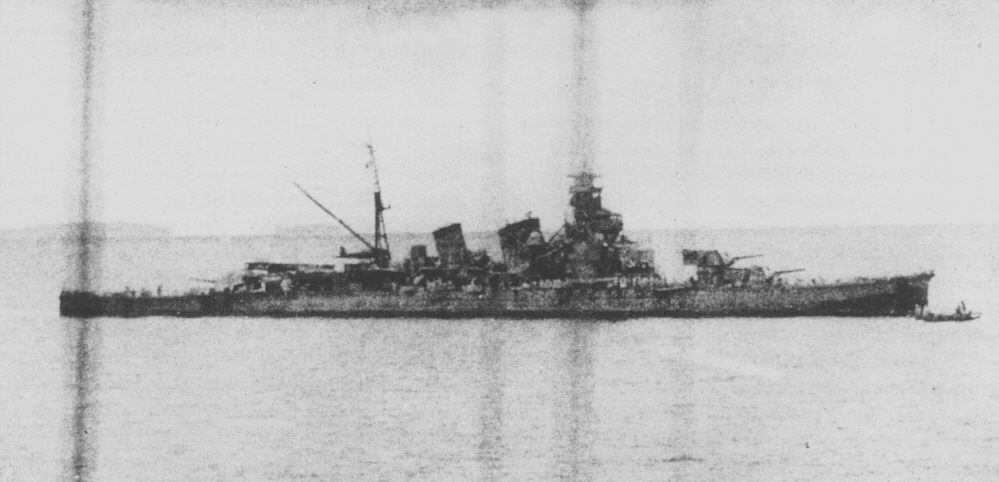
Heavy cruiser Aoba, Rear Adm. Goto's flagship

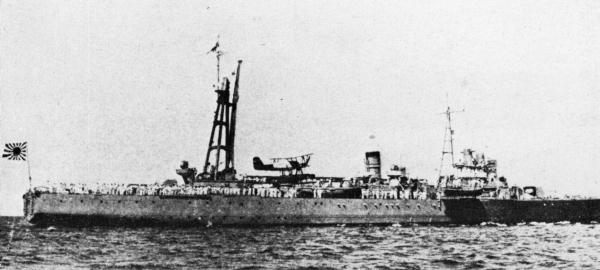
Minelayer Okinoshima, Rear Adm. Shima's flagship

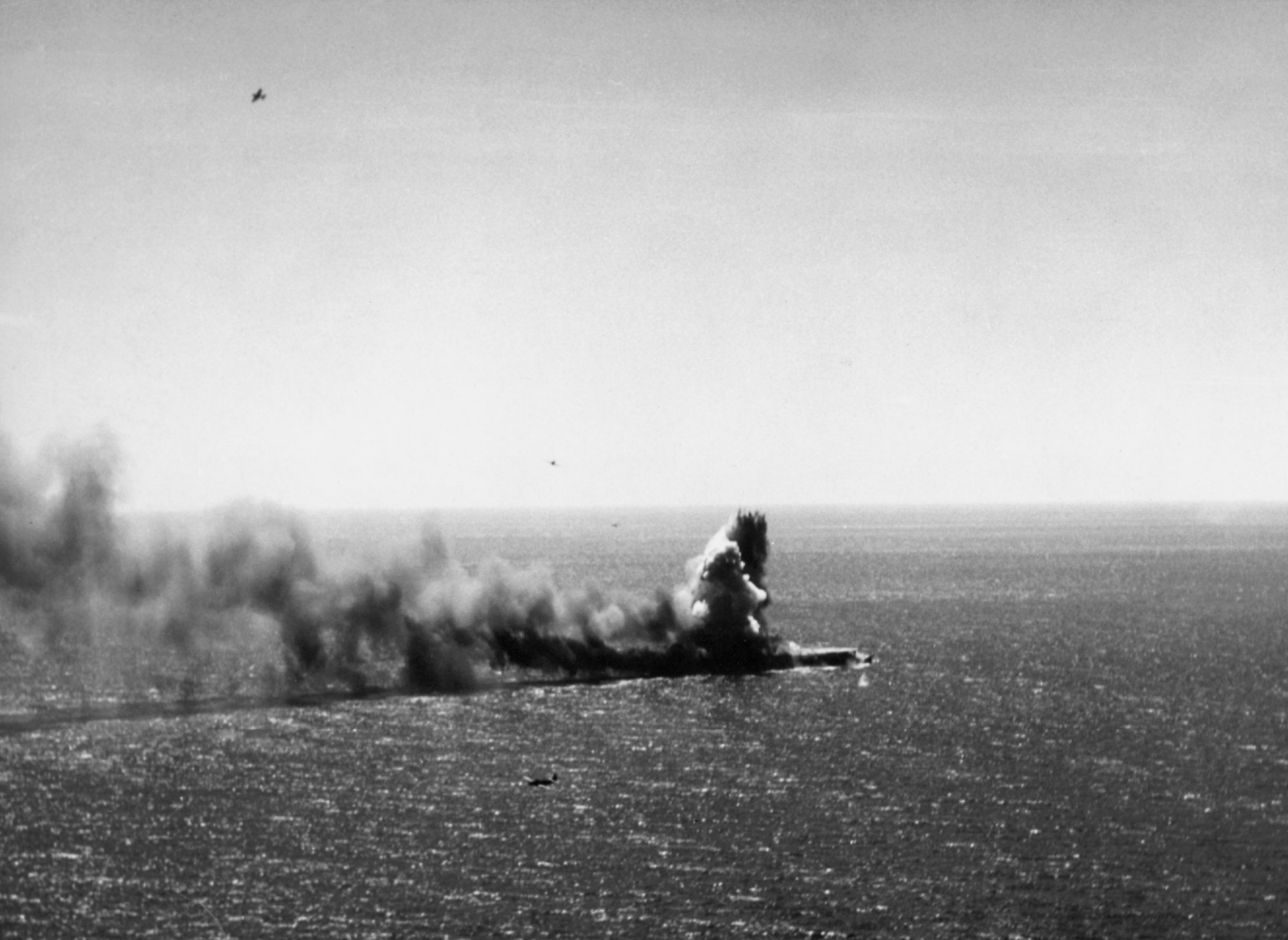
Light carrier Shōhō under attack by US aircraft

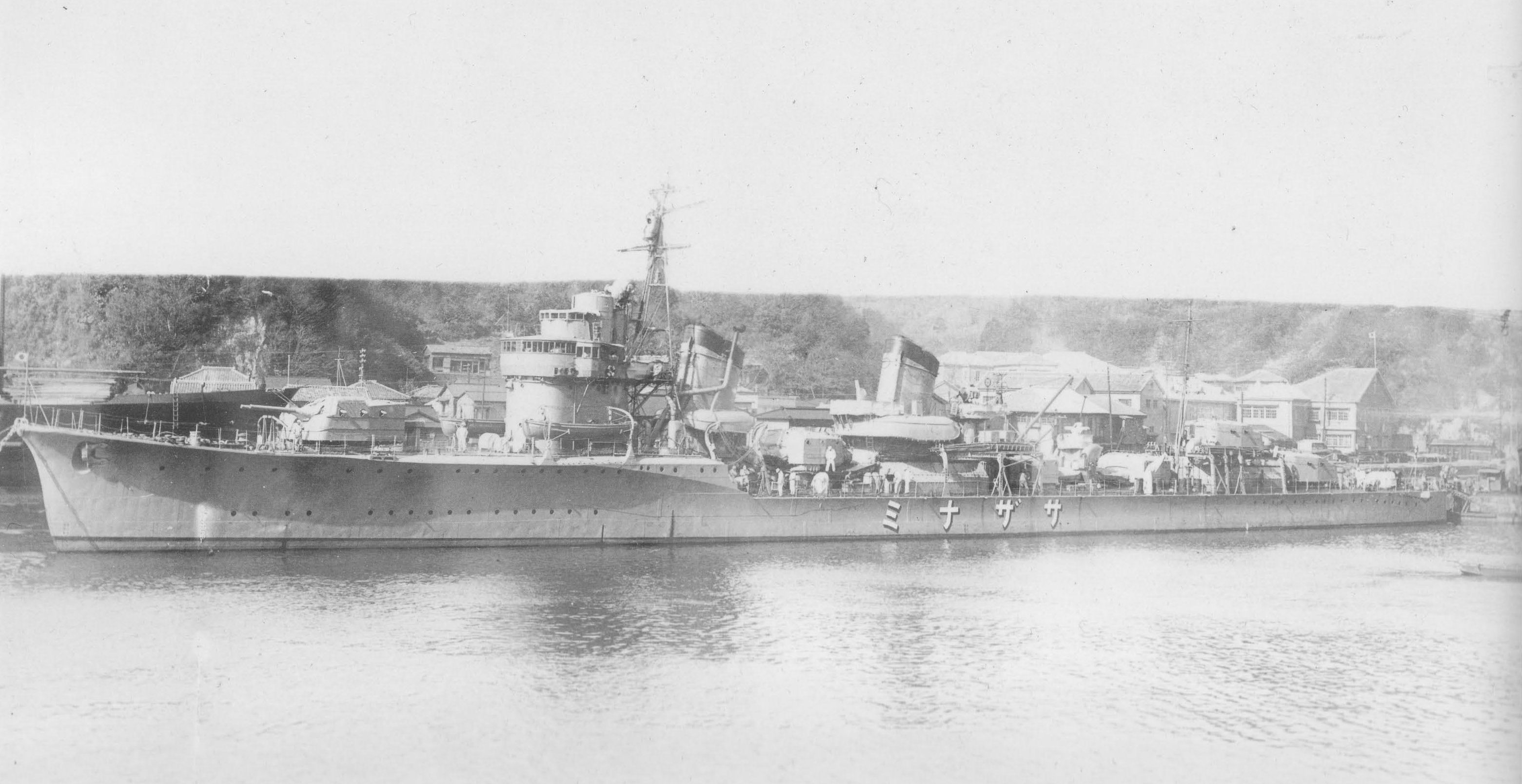
Destroyer Sazanami

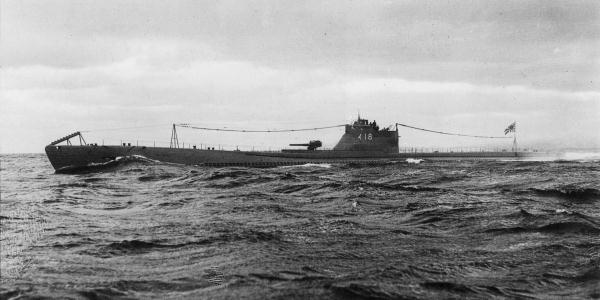
I-class submarine

Rear Admiral Aritomo Gotō in heavy cruiser Aoba

Tulagi Invasion Group
Rear Admiral Kiyohide Shima in minelayer Okinoshima

1 transport: Azumasan Maru

Embarking 400 troops from the 3rd Kure Special Naval Landing Force (SNLF) plus a construction detachment from the 7th Establishment Squad.

2 minelayers: Okinoshima, (Note: Commanded by Captain Nomi Minoru and was flagship of Mine Division 19; sunk by US submarine S-42 10 May 1942 during Operation RY.) Kōei Maru
2 destroyers: Kikuzuki (sunk by air attack 5 May), Yūzuki (Note: From Destroyer Squadron 6 (Bullard, p. 56 says Destroyer Squadron 23).)
5 minesweepers: Wa #1 (sunk), Wa #2 (sunk), Hagoromo Maru, Noshiro Maru #2, Tama Maru (sunk) (Note: The latter three ships were from the 14th Minesweeper Flotilla.)
2 subchasers: Toshi Maru #3, Tama Maru #8 (Note: From the 56th Submarine Chaser Squadron.)

Support Group/Close Cover Force
Rear Admiral Kuninori Marumo in light cruiser Tenryū

Cruiser Division 18 (Rear Adm. Marumo)

2 light cruisers

Both Tenryū-class: Tenryū, Tatsuta

2 seaplane tenders (Note: Kiyokawa Maru was under repair at Yokohama, Japan but its airgroup was at Rabaul and assisted Kamikawa Maru'ss airgroup in the invasion of Tulagi. When Kamikawa Maru departed Santa Isabel on 4 May to support the Port Moresby invasion from Deboyne, the Kiyokawa Maru aircraft remained at Santa Isabel and Tulgai and/or were attached to Kamikawa's airgroup for the Deboyne deployment.)

Kamikawa Maru

Air group: 12 aircraft

Kiyokawa Maru

Air group (attached)

3 gunboats: Keijo Maru, Seikai Maru, Nikkai Maru (Note: Nikkai Maru and oiler Iro helped establish a Japanese port and seaplane base in the Shortland Islands on 28 April 1942 prior to participating in Mo.)

Covering Group/Main Body Support Force
Rear Adm. Gotō in Aoba (Note: Gotō was in tactical command of the Mo invasion forces.)

Cruiser Division 6 (Rear Adm. Gotō)

4 heavy cruisers: Aoba, Kako, Kinugasa, Furutaka (Note: On 8 May Furutaka and Kinugasa were attached to Carrier Division 5 and helped escort Zuikaku back to Truk. Aoba and Kako helped cover the Port Moresby invasion convoy's return to Rabaul.)

1 light carrier Shōhō (sunk by air attack 7 May)

Air Group (Lt. Kenjirō Nōtomi†)

8 Mitsubishi A6M Zero and 4 Mitsubishi A5M "Claude" fighters (Lt. Nōtomi†)
6 Nakajima B5N Type 97 "Kate" torpedo bombers (Lt. Michitarō Nakamoto†)

1 destroyer: Sazanami

Port Moresby Invasion Group
Rear Admiral Sadamichi Kajioka in light cruiser Yūbari (Note: Also commander of Destroyer Squadron 6.)

Transport Unit (Rear Adm. Kōsō Abe)

5 Imperial Japanese Navy (IJN) transports: Mogamigawa Maru, Chōwa Maru, Goyō Maru, (Note: Goyo Maru was later converted into an oiler.) (Note: Apparently, the Azumasan Maru was supposed to join from the Tulagi Invasion Group but did not, perhaps as a result of battle damage) Akiba Maru, Shōka Maru.

Embarking approximately 500 troops from the 3rd Kure SNLF plus construction specialists from the 10th Establishment Squad

6 Imperial Japanese Army (IJA) transports: Asakasan Maru, China Maru, Mito Maru, Matsue Maru, Taifuku Maru, Hibi Maru

Embarking South Seas Detachment of approximately 5,000 troops (Note: The South Seas Detachment was primarily from the 55th Division commanded by Major General Tomitarō Horii and included troops from the 55th Infantry Group, centered on the 144th Infantry Regiment, as well as the 47th Field Anti-Aircraft Battalion and attached medical and water supply support units.)

5 minesweepers: W-20 (Wa #20), Hagoromo Maru, Noshiro Maru #2, Fumi Maru #2, Seki Maru #3. (Note: All the minesweepers from Shima's Tulagi Invasion Group were to have joined the Port Moresby Invasion Group. Only Hagoromo Maru and Noshiro Maru #2 survived the Yorktown's airstrikes to do so.)
1 minelayer: Tsugaru (Capt. Inagaki Yoshiaki) (Note: Member of Mine Division 19 with Okinoshima.)
1 salvage tugboat: Woshima
2 oilers: Hoyo Maru, Irō (Note: Iro and gunboat Nikkai Maru helped establish a Japanese port and seaplane base in the Shortland Islands on 28 April 1942 prior to participating in Mo. Iro and destroyer Uzuki remained at the Shortlands to refuel Gotō's Covering Group after it completed its support mission of the Tulagi invasion.)

Screen

1 light cruiser: Yūbari (Capt. Masami Ban) (Note: Flagship of Destroyer Squadron 6.)
6 destroyers: Oite, Asanagi, Uzuki, Mutsuki, Mochizuki, Yayoi (Note: Oite and Asanagi were from Destroyer Squadron 29, Mutsuki, Mochizuki, and Yayoi from Destroyer Squadron 30, and Uzuki from Destroyer Squadron 23.)
1 or 2 unidentified patrol boats

=== Submarine Force ===
Captain Noboru Ishizaki

Patrol/Scouting Group: I-21, I-22, I-24, I-28, I-29 (Note: From Submarine Squadron 8. I-28 was sunk by the US submarine Tautog on 17 May as I-28 returned to base at Truk.)
Raiding Group: Ro-33, Ro-34 (Note: From the 21st Submarine Group.)

=== Air Forces ===
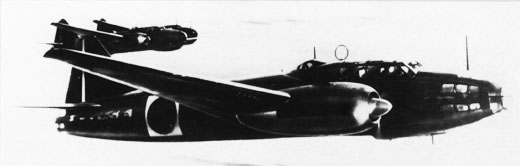
Mitsubishi G4M "Betty" bomber

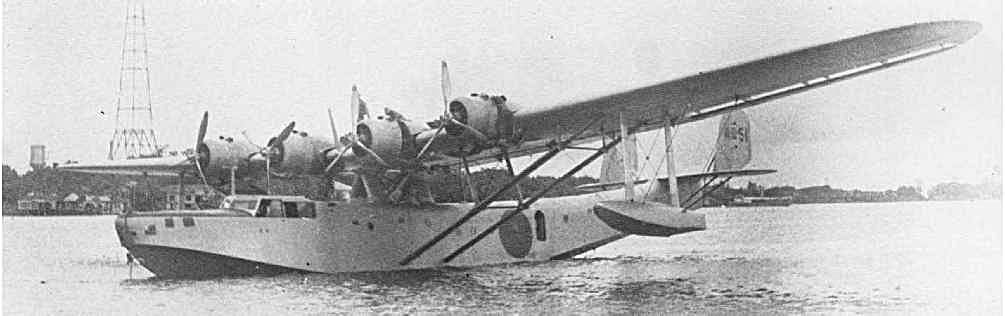
Kawanishi H6K "Mavis" flying boat

25th Air Flotilla (Note: Also called the 5th Air Attack Force; aircraft numbers are of 1 May 1942.)
Rear Admiral Sadayoshi Yamada

4th Air Group (based at Rabaul)

17 Mitsubishi G4M Type 1 "Betty" land attack bombers

Tainan Air Group (based at Lae and Rabaul)

18 Mitsubishi A6M Zero "Zeke"
6 Mitsubishi A5M "Claude" fighters (Capt. Masahisa Saitō)

Yokohama Air Group (based at Rabaul, Shortland Islands, and Tulagi)

12 Kawanishi H6K "Mavis" reconnaissance seaplanes
9 Nakajima A6M2-N "Rufe" seaplane fighters (Note: Six Kawanishi deployed from Rabaul to the Shortlands on 28 April.)

Genzan Air Group (based at Rabaul)

25 Mitsubishi G3M Type 96 "Nell" land attack bombers (Note: Crave states the Genzan had 27 aircraft.)

== Allied Forces ==
Task force and carrier group commanders

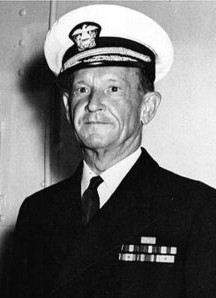
Rear Adm. Frank Jack Fletcher

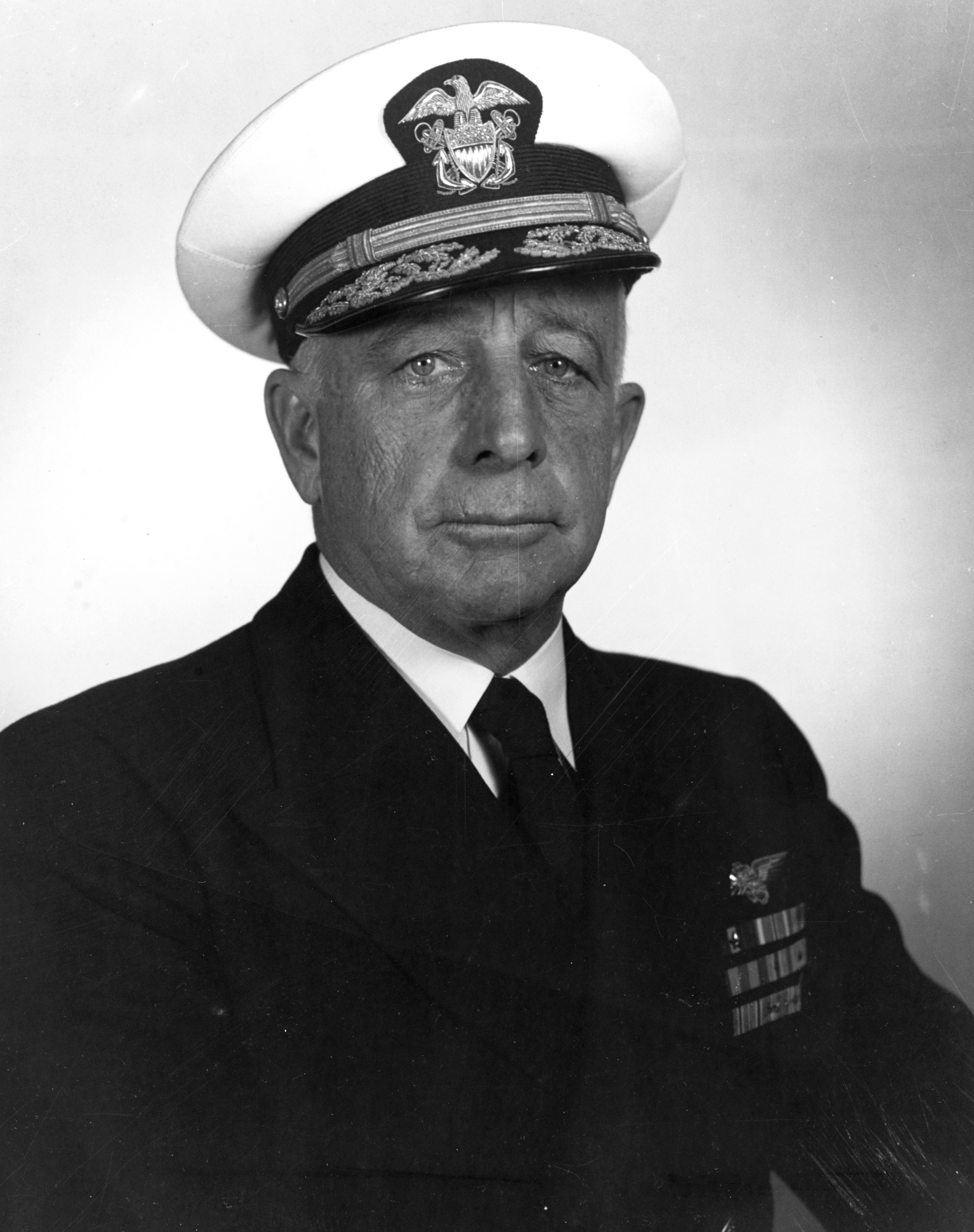
Rear Adm. Aubrey W. Fitch

=== Task Force 17 ===
TF 17 carriers

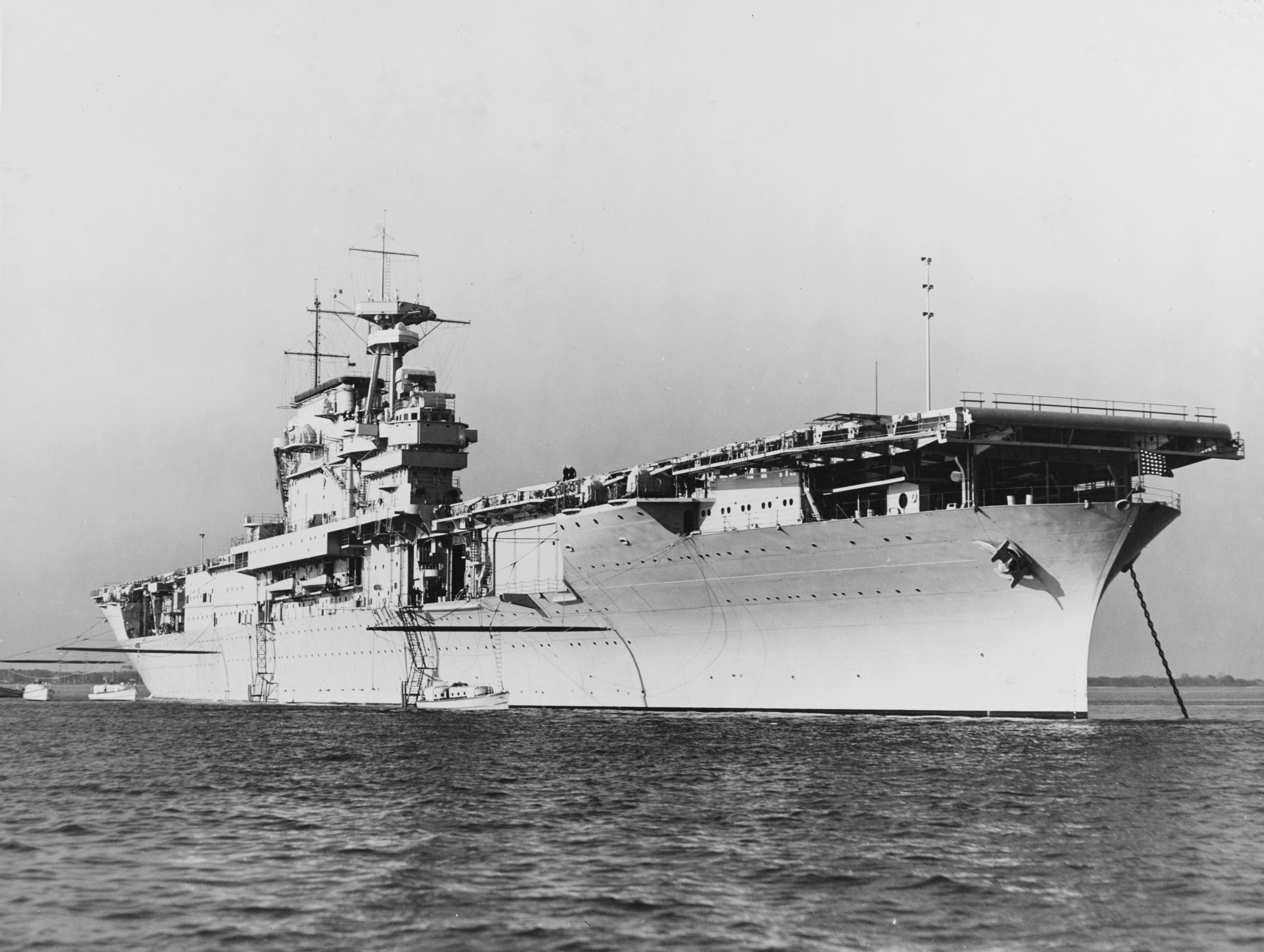
Yorktown (sunk at Midway in June)

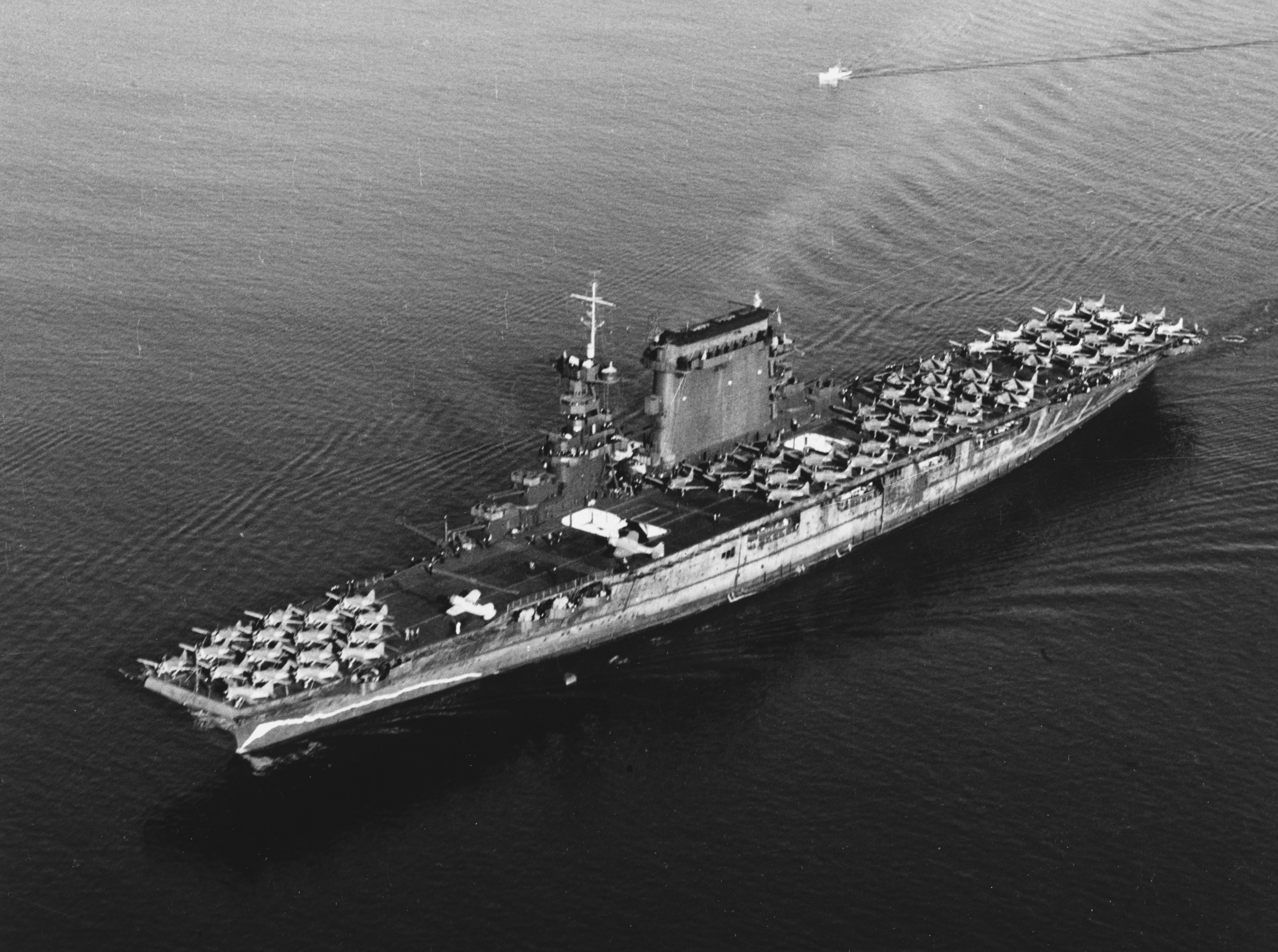
Lexington (the 8" guns were removed shortly before the battle)

Early-war US naval aircraft

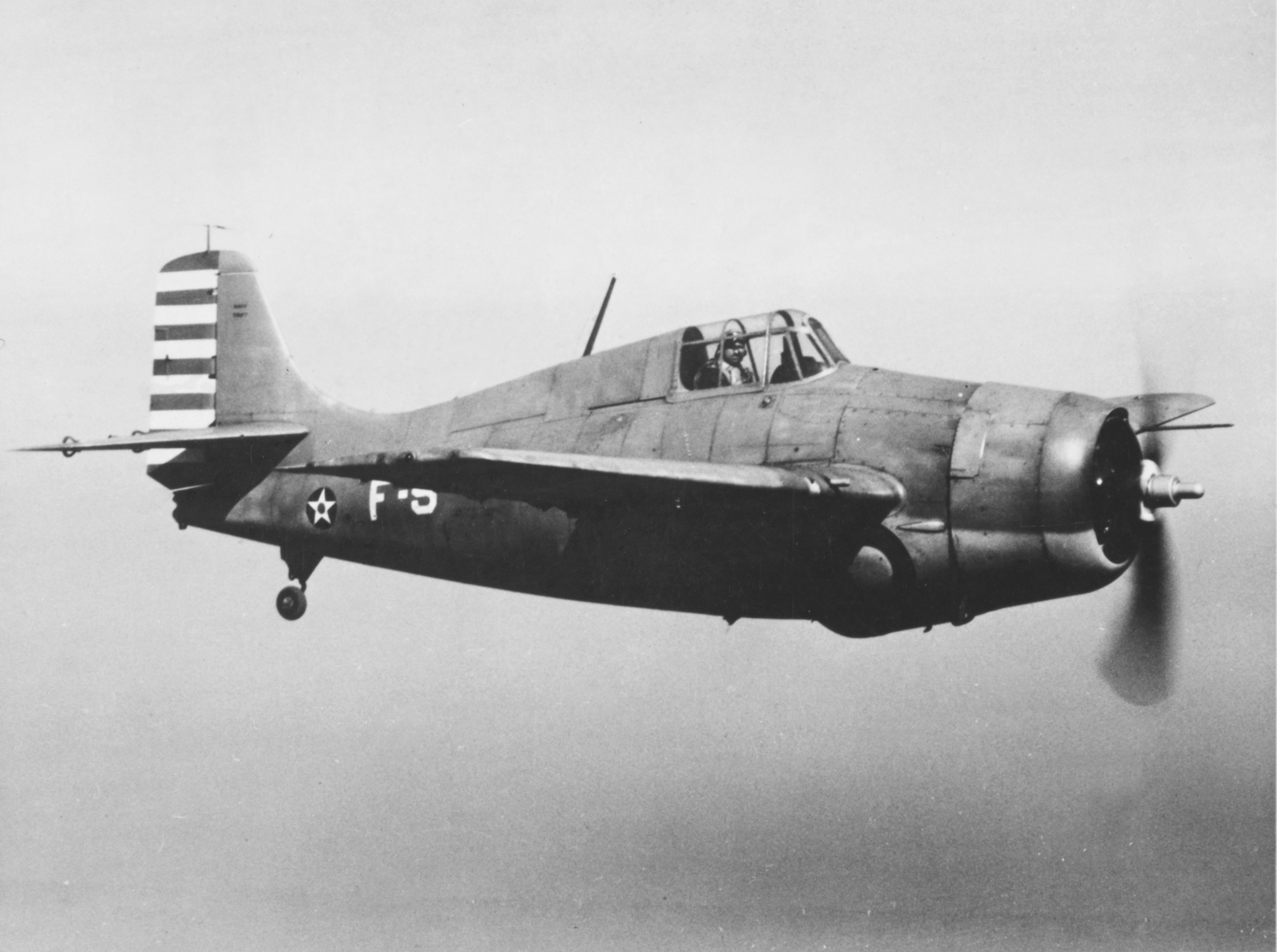
Grumman F4F Wildcat fighter

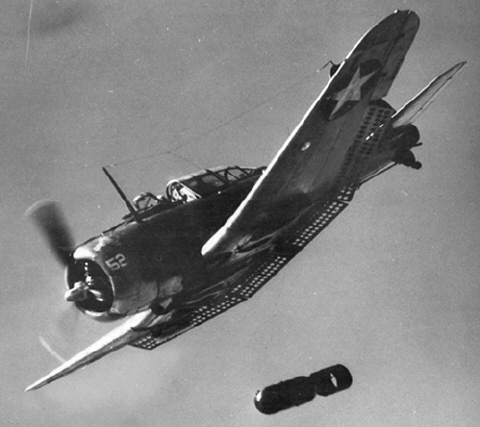
Douglas SBD Dauntless dive bomber

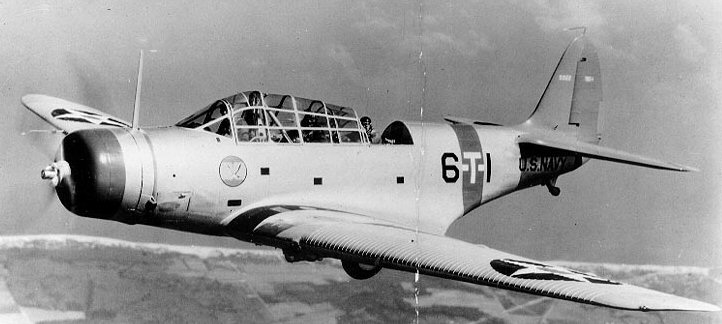
Douglas TBD Devastator torpedo bomber

US combat vessels

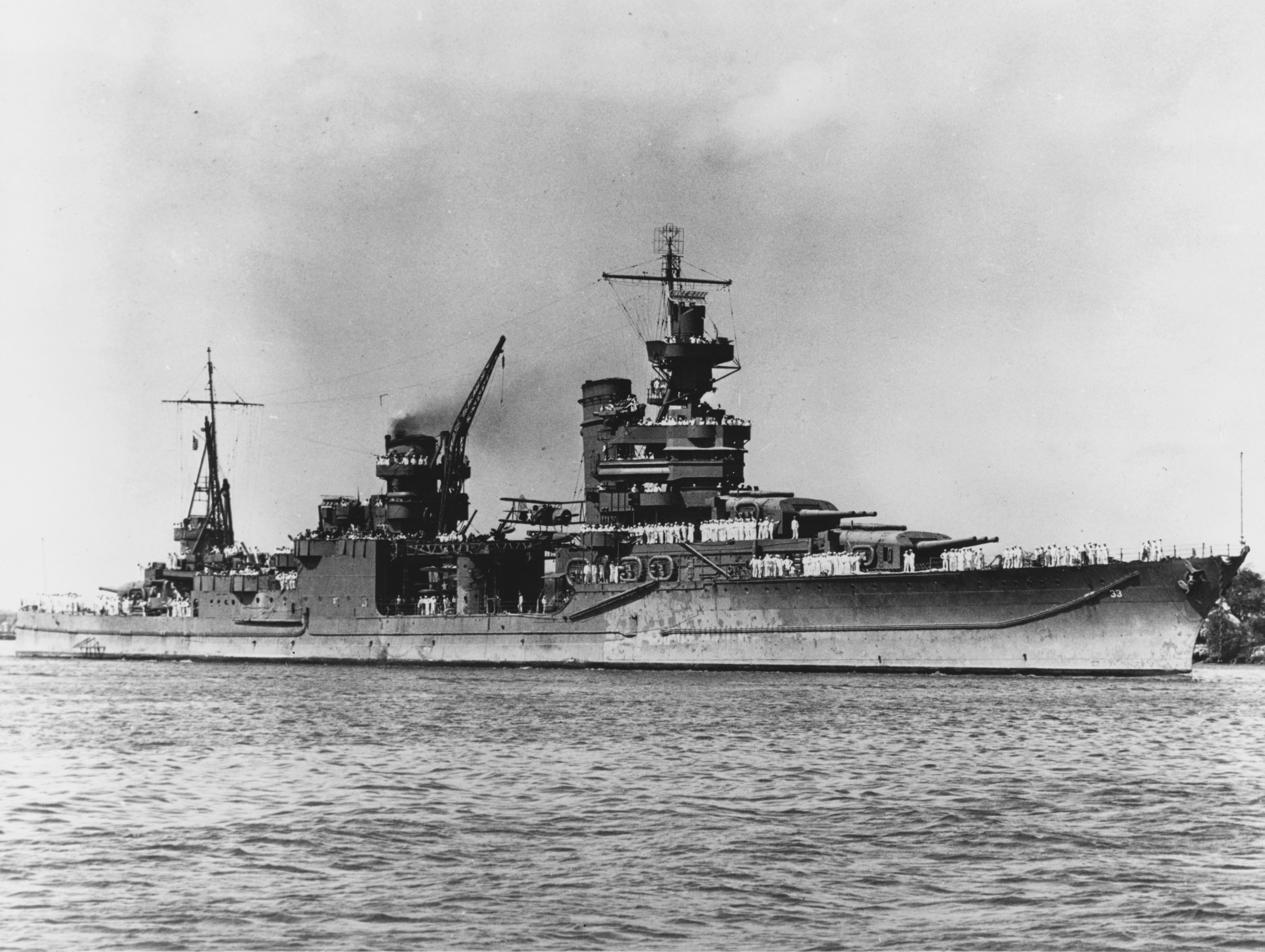
Heavy cruiser Portland at Pearl Harbor

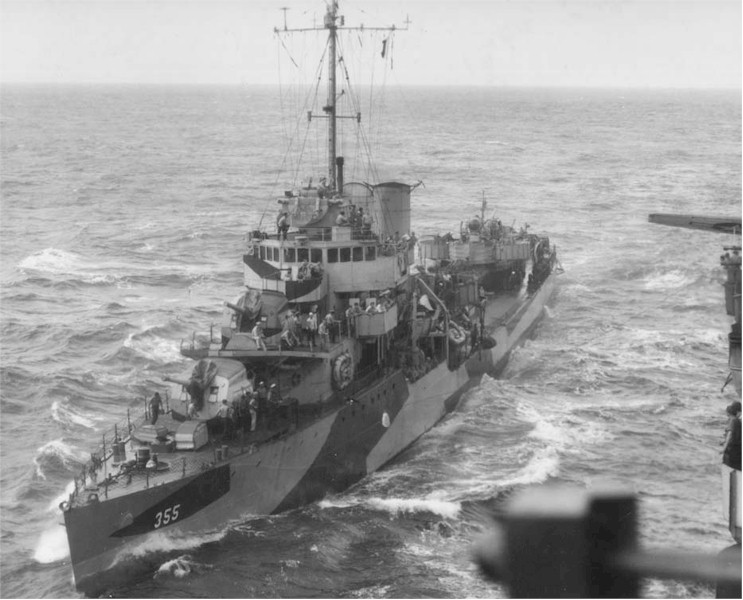
Farragut-class destroyer Aylwin outfitted in dazzle camouflage

Rear Admiral Frank Jack Fletcher in Yorktown

Carrier Air Group (TG 17.5)
Rear Admiral Aubrey W. Fitch, Officer in Tactical Command (OTC) (Note: Both carriers together were designated Task Unit 17.5.1 under Fitch.)

2 fleet carriers

Yorktown (Capt. Elliott Buckmaster)

Air Group (Lt. Cmdr. Oscar Pederson)

VF-42: 17 F4F Wildcat fighters (Lt. Cmdr. Charles R. Fenton)
VB-5: 18 SBD Dauntless dive bombers (Lt. Wallace C. Short)
VS-5: 17 SBD Dauntless scout bombers (Lt. Cmdr. William O. Burch, Jr.)
VT-5: 13 TBD Devastator torpedo bombers (Lt. Cmdr. Joe Taylor)

Lexington (Capt. Frederick C. Sherman) (scuttled 8 May following severe damage from air attack)

Air Group (Cmdr. William B. Ault†) (Note: Ault flew an SBD not assigned to either of the SBD squadrons.)

VF-2: 21 F4F Wildcat fighters (Lt. Cmdr. Paul H. Ramsey)
VB-2: 18 SBD Dauntless dive bombers (Lt. Cmdr. Weldon L. Hamilton)
VS-2: 17 SBD Dauntless scout bombers (Lt. Cmdr. Robert E. Dixon)
VT-2: 12 TBD Devastator torpedo bombers (Lt. Cmdr. James H. Brett, Jr.)

4 destroyers

All Sims-class (4 × 5-in. main battery) (Note: Task Unit 17.5.4 under Captain Gilbert C. Hoover.)

Morris (Cmdr. Harry B. Jarrett)
Anderson (Lt. Cmdr. John K. B. Ginder)
Hammann (Lt. Cmdr. Arnold E. True)
Russell (Lt. Cmdr. Glenn R. Hartwig)

Attack Group (TG 17.2)
Rear Admiral Thomas C. Kinkaid

5 heavy cruisers

3 New Orleans-class (9 × 8-in. main battery)

New Orleans (Capt. Howard H. Good)
Astoria (Capt. Francis W. Scanland)
Minneapolis (Capt. Frank J. Lowry) (Note: Minneapolis and New Orleans were designated Task Unit 17.2.1 under Kinkaid and the other three cruisers were Task Unit 17.2.2 under Rear Admiral William W. Smith.)

1 Portland-class (9 × 8-in. main battery)

Portland (Capt. Benjamin Perlman)

1 Northampton-class (9 × 8-in. main battery)

Chester (Capt. Thomas M. Shock)

Screen (Capt. Alexander R. Early)

5 destroyers

1 Porter-class (8 × 5-in. main battery)

Phelps (Lt. Cmdr. Edward L. Beck)

4 Farragut-class (5 × 5-in. main battery)

Farragut (Cmdr. George P. Hunter)
Dewey (Lt. Cmdr. Charles F. Chillingworth, Jr.)
Monaghan (Lt. Cmdr. William P. Burfor
Aylwin (Lt. Cmdr. Robert H. Rogers) (Note: Task Unit 17.2.4 under Captain Alexander R. Early)

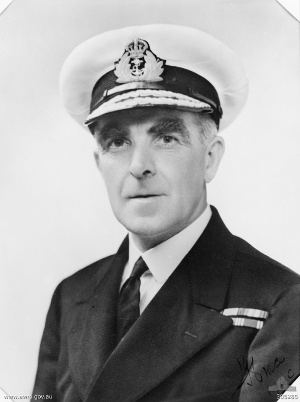
Rear Adm. John Gregory Crace, RAN

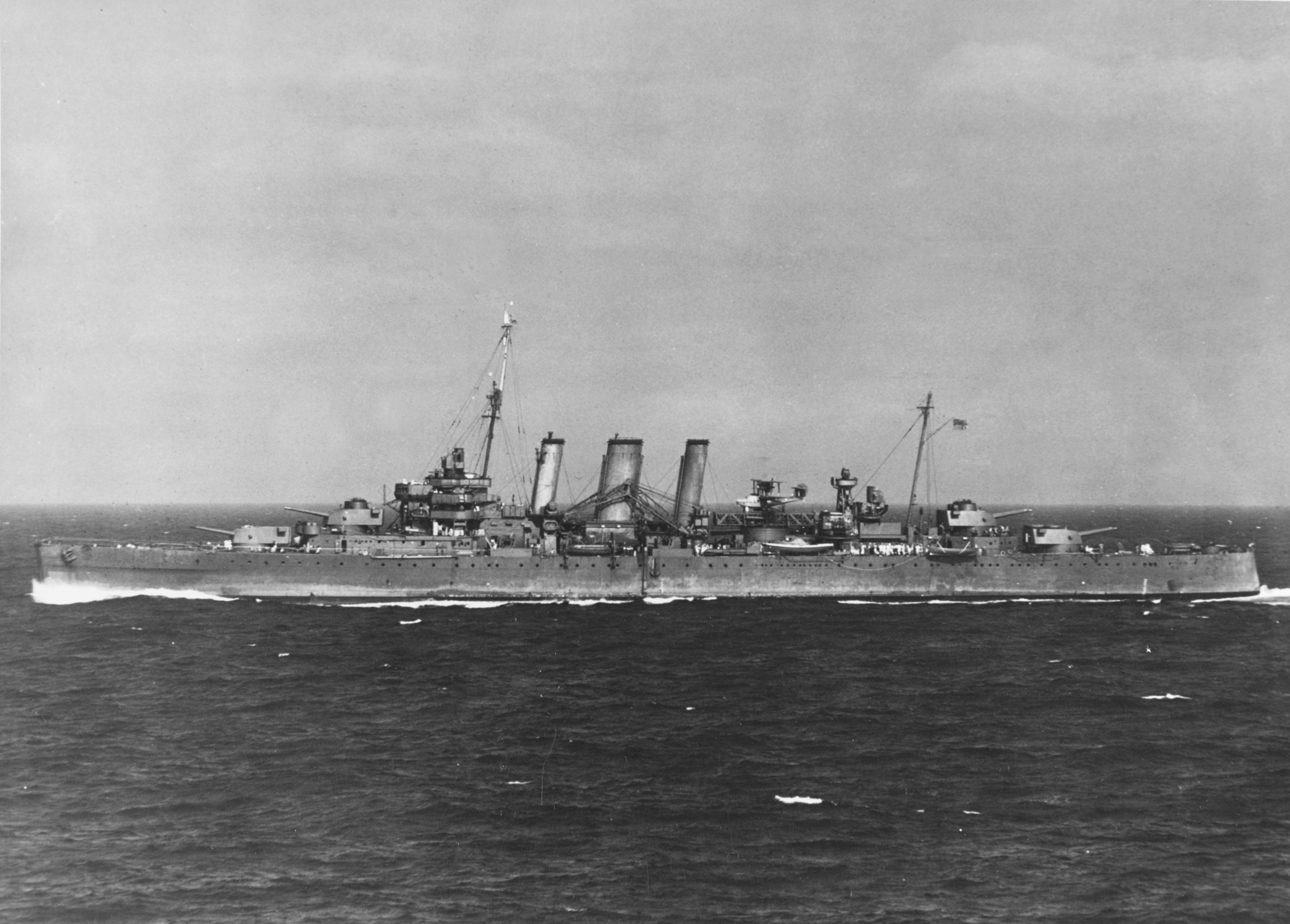
Heavy cruiser HMAS Australia

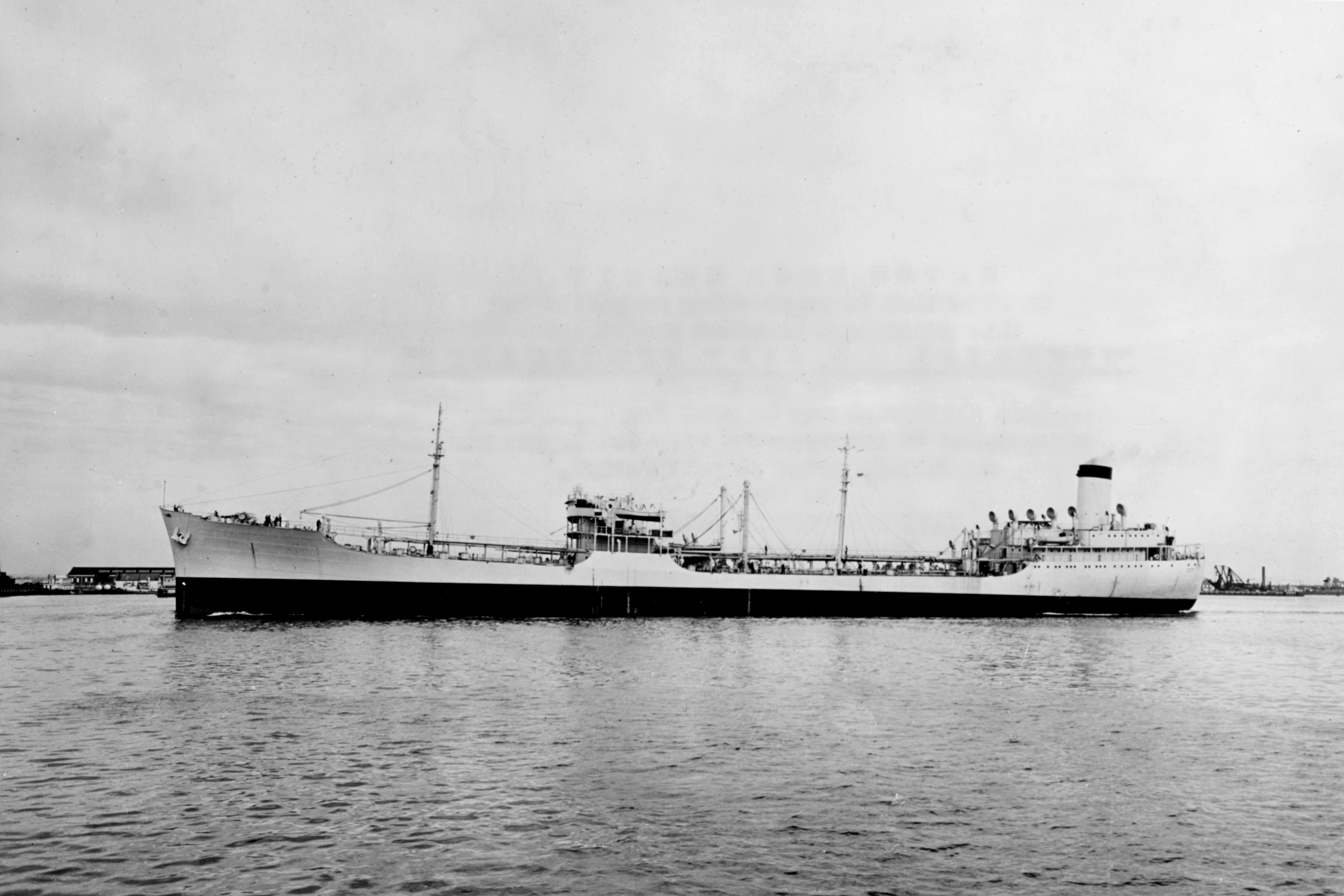
Oiler Neosho

Support Group (TG 17.3) (Note: From Task Force 44)
Rear Admiral John Gregory Crace, RAN

2 heavy cruisers

1 Northampton-class (9 × 8-in. main battery): Chicago (Capt. Howard D. Bode) (Note: Committed suicide after learning he would be held partially responsible for the debacle at the Battle of Savo Island.)
1 County-class (8 × 8-in. main battery): Australia (Capt. H. B. Farncomb, RAN)

1 light cruiser

1 Leander-class (8 × 6-in. main battery): Hobart (Capt. H. L. Howden, RAN)

2 destroyers (Note: Task Unit 17.3.4 under Commander Francis X. McInerney.)

1 Mahan-class (5 × 5-in.main battery): Perkins (Lt. Cmdr. Walter C. Ford)
1 Sims-class (4 × 5-in. main battery): Walke (Lt. Cmdr. Thomas E. Fraser)

Fueling Group (TG 17.6)
Captain John S. Phillips†

2 oilers

Neosho (sunk by air attack 7 May), Tippecanoe

2 destroyers

Sims (sunk by air attack 7 May) (Lt. Cmdr. Willford M. Hyman†), Worden

Search Group (TG 17.9)
Commander George H. DeBaun

1 seaplane tender

Tangier (Note: Based at Noumea)

Patrol Squadron 71 (VP-71): 6 PBY-5 Catalinas
Patrol Squadron 72 (VP-72): 6 PBY-5 Catalinas

=== South West Pacific Area ===
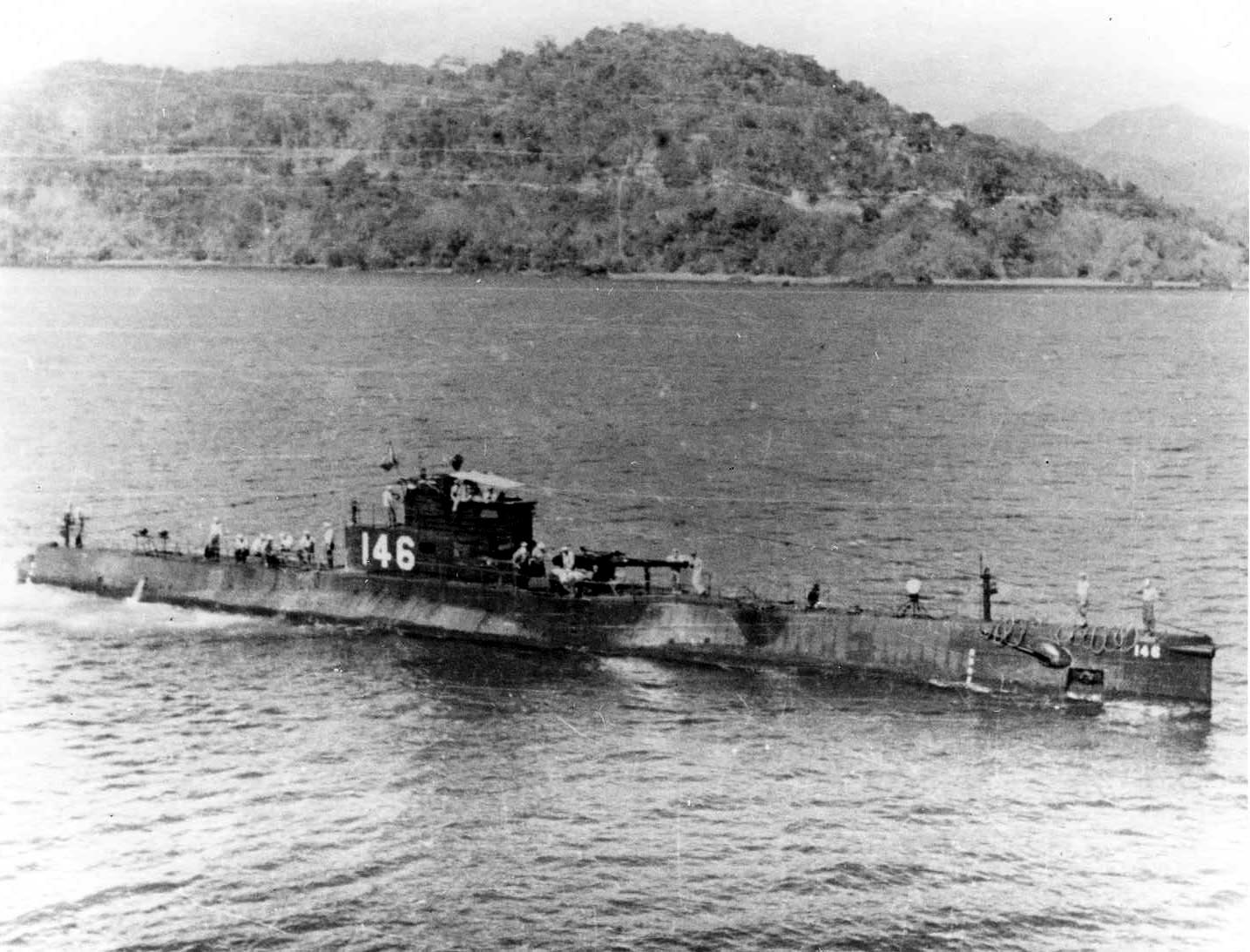
Submarine S-41

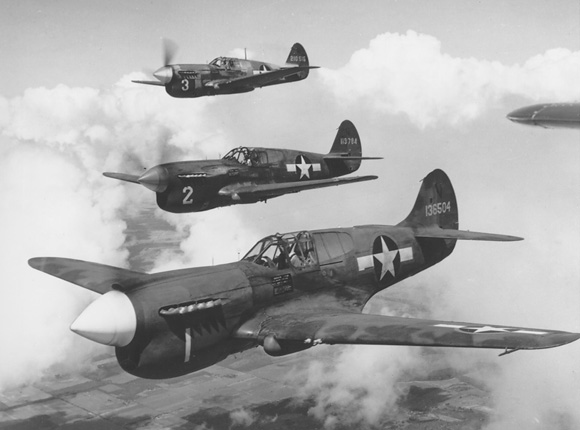
Curtiss P-40 "Tomahawks"

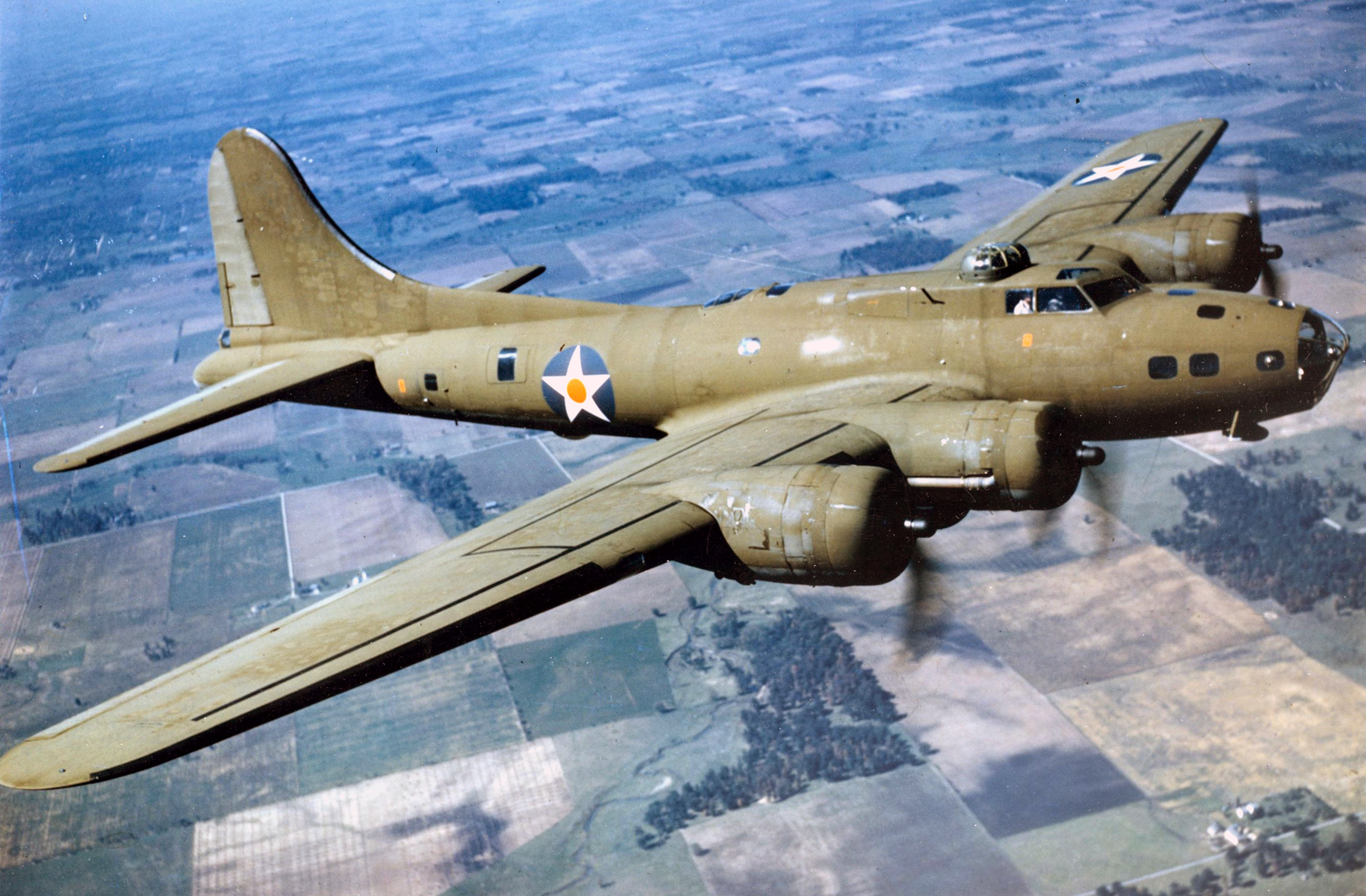
Boeing B-17 "Flying Fortress"

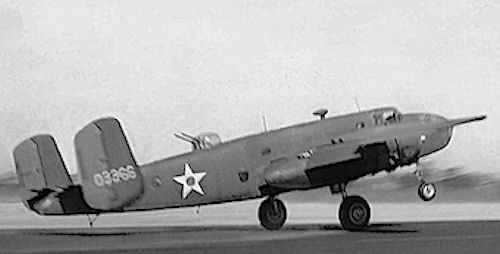
North American B-25 "Mitchell"

General Douglas MacArthur

Allied Naval Forces
Vice Admiral Herbert F. Leary (Note: Reassigned because of difficult relationship with MacArthur.)

Task Group 42.1 (Capt. Ralph Waldo Christie in submarine tender USS Griffin at Brisbane) (Note: Only S-38, S-42, S-44, and S-47 were involved in the battle.)

Subdiv 53 (Lt. Cmdr. Elmer E. Yeomans): S-42, S-43, S-44, S-45, S-46, S-47
Subdiv 201 (Cmdr. Ralston B. Van Zant): S-37, S-38, S-39, S-40, S-41

Task Force 44 – temporarily assigned to Task Force 17, see Task Group 17.3 above

Allied Air Forces
Lieutenant General George Brett

United States Army Air Forces

8th Pursuit Group: 26 P-39 Airacobra fighters at Archerfield, Brisbane

35th Fighter Squadron at Port Moresby
36th Fighter Squadron at Port Moresby

49th Pursuit Group: 90 P-40 Tomahawk fighters at Darwin

7th Fighter Squadron at Darwin
8th Fighter Squadron at Darwin
9th Fighter Squadron at Darwin

3rd Light Bombardment Group

8th Light Bombardment Squadron: A-24 Banshee dive bombers at Port Moresby
13th Light Bombardment Squadron: B-25 Mitchell bombers
90th Light Bombardment Squadron: B-25 Mitchell bombers

19th Bombardment Group: 17 Boeing B-17 bombers at Townsville (Lt. Col. Connally (first name unknown))

30th Bombardment Squadron
40th Reconnaissance Squadron
93rd Bombardment Squadron
435th Bombardment Squadron

22nd Bombardment Group: 48 Martin B-26 Marauders

Royal Australian Air Force

No. 11 Squadron: Consolidated PBY Catalinas
No. 20 Squadron: PBY Catalinas
No. 24 Squadron: 3 CAC Wirraways at Townsville
No. 32 Squadron: Lockheed Hudsons at Port Moresby
No. 75 Squadron: 3 Curtiss P-40s at Port Moresby

Port Moresby garrison

Major General B. M. Morris
Approximately 5,000 troops

30th Infantry Brigade

39th Infantry Battalion (Note: Commanded by Lieutenant Colonel H. M. Conran.)
49th Infantry Battalion
53rd Infantry Battalion
13th Field Regiment
23rd Heavy Anti-Aircraft Battery (Note: Consisted of four 3.7 inch stationary guns and three mobile 3 inch guns.)
Detachment, 1st Independent Company
30th Infantry Brigade Signal Section
30th Infantry Brigade HQ Defence Platoon

Moresby Fixed Defences

Moresby Fixed Defences Fortress Engineers
Moresby Fixed Defences Anti-Aircraft Artillery (six 3-inch guns)

1st Army Troops Company
7th Field Company
1st Section, 1st Mechanical Equipment Company
8th Military District Survey Section
8th Military District Bomb Disposal Section
8th Military District Signals
8th Military District Defence and Employment Company
New Guinea Volunteer Rifles
Papuan Infantry Battalion, (Note: Commanded by Major W. T. Watson.)
8th Military District Section Intelligence Corps
15th Supply Personnel Company
8th Military District Bulk Issue Petrol and Oil Depot
A Section, 8th Military District Mechanical Transport Company
Base Hospital
3rd Field Ambulance
113th Convalescent Depot
8th Military District Dental Centre

45th Dental Unit
253rd Dental Unit
256th Dental Unit
274th Dental Unit
301st Dental Unit
421st Dental Unit

15th Optical Unit
8th Military District Depot of Medical Stores
16th Field Hygiene Section
8th Military District Ordnance Depot
19th Ordnance Ammunition Section
109th Infantry Brigade Group Field Workshop
109th Infantry Brigade Group Ordnance Field Park
30th Infantry Brigade Provost Platoon
8th Military District Accounts Office
8th Military District Postal Unit
8th Military District Records Office
8th Military District Stationery Depot
8th Military District Printing Section
8th Military District Graves Registration and Inquiries Unit
8th Military District Laundry and Decontamination Unit
8th Military District Army Field Bakery
8th Military District Base Depot
8th Military District Marine Section
8th Military District Canteen Services
8th Military District Training Centre
Australian New Guinea Administrative Unit

== Bibliography ==
=== Printed sources ===
- Bowman, Martin (2003). B-17 Flying Fortress Units of the Pacific War. Great Britain: Osprey Publishing. ISBN 1-84176-481-7.
- Dull, Paul S. (1978). A Battle History of the Imperial Japanese Navy, 1941–1945. Naval Institute Press. ISBN 0-87021-097-1.
- Hoyt, Edwin Palmer (2003). Blue Skies and Blood: The Battle of the Coral Sea. I Books. ISBN 0-7434-5835-4.
- Jersey, Stanley Coleman (2008). Hell's Islands: The Untold Story of Guadalcanal. College Station, Texas: Texas A&M University Press. ISBN 978-1-58544-616-2.
- Lundstrom, John B. (2006). Black Shoe Carrier Admiral: Frank Jack Fletcher at Coral Sea, Midway, and Guadalcanal. Annapolis, Maryland: Naval Institute Press. ISBN 1-59114-475-2.
- Lundstrom, John B. (2005). The First Team: Pacific Naval Air Combat from Pearl Harbor to Midway (New ed.). Annapolis, Maryland: Naval Institute Press. ISBN 1-59114-471-X.
- Morison, Samuel Eliot (2001) [1949]. Coral Sea, Midway and Submarine Actions, May 1942 – August 1942, vol. 4 of History of United States Naval Operations in World War II. Champaign, Illinois: University of Illinois Press. ISBN 0-252-06995-1.
- Rottman, Gordon L. (2005). Japanese Army in World War II: Conquest of the Pacific 1941–42. Oxford: Osprey. ISBN 1-84176-789-1.
- Salecker, Eric (2001). Fortress Against the Sun: The B-17 Flying Fortress in the Pacific. United States: Da Capo Press. ISBN 1-58097-049-4.
- Willmott, H. P. (1983). The Barrier and the Javelin: Japanese and Allied Pacific Strategies February to June 1942. Annapolis, Maryland: Naval Institute Press. ISBN 0-87021-535-3.
- Iwashige, Tashirō (2009). The visual guide of Japanese wartime merchant marine. Japan: Dainippon Kaiga. ISBN 978-4-499-22989-0.

=== Web ===
- Japanese army operations in the South Pacific Area New Britain and Papua campaigns, 1942–43. Senshi Sōshō (translated excerpts). Translated by Bullard, Steven. Canberra: Australian War Memorial. 2007. ISBN 978-0-9751904-8-7. Archived from the original on 9 April 2009.
- Crave, Wesley Frank; James Lea Cate (1947). Volume I: Plans and Early Operations, January 1939 to August 1942. The Army Air Forces in World War II. Washington DC: [United States] Office of Air Force History. Archived from the original on 21 April 2009.
- Gill, G. Hermon (1968). Volume II – Royal Australian Navy, 1942–1945. Australia in the War of 1939–1945, Series 2: Navy. Canberra: Australian War Memorial. Archived from the original on 27 September 2013.
- Gillison, Douglas (1962). "Chapter 26 – Coral Sea and Midway". Volume I – Royal Australian Air Force, 1939–1942. Australia in the War of 1939–1945, Series 3: Air. Canberra: Australian War Memorial. Archived from the original on 25 May 2009.
- Hackett, Bob; Sander Kingsepp (1998–2005). "IJN Minelayer Okinoshima: Tabular Record of Movement". Combinedfleet.com. Archived from the original on 28 October 2006.
- Hackett, Bob; Sander Kingsepp (2009). "IJN Tatsuta: Tabular Record of Movement". Junyokan!. Combinedfleet.com.
- Hackett, Bob; Sander Kingsepp (2009). "IJN Tenryu: Tabular Record of Movement". Junyokan!. Combinedfleet.com.
- Hackett, Bob; Sander Kingsepp; Peter Cundall (2007). "IJN Minelayer Tsugaru: Tabular Record of Movement". Fusetsukan!. Combinedfleet.com.
- Hackett, Bob; Peter Cundall (2007). "IJN Repair Ship Ojima: Tabular Record of Movement". Kyunansen Ken Eisen. Combinedfleet.com.
- Hackett, Bob; Sander Kingsepp; Allan Alsleben; Peter Cundall (2009). "IJN Seaplane Tender Kiyokawa Maru: Tabular Record of Movement". Tokusetsu Suijoki-Bokan!. Combinedfleet.com. Archived from the original on 19 November 2009.
- Hackett, Bob; Sander Kingsepp (2009). "IJN Yubari: Tabular Record of Movement". Junyokan!. Combinedfleet.com. Archived from the original on 4 May 2009.
- McCarthy, Dudley (1959). Volume V – South–West Pacific Area – First Year: Kokoda to Wau. Australia in the War of 1939–1945, Series 1: Army. Canberra: Australian War Memorial. Archived from the original on 25 May 2009.
- Office of Naval Intelligence (1943). "The Battle of the Coral Sea". Combat Narrative. Publications Branch, Office of Naval Intelligence, United States Navy. Archived from the original on 24 December 2006.
- United States Army Center of Military History. "Japanese Operations in the Southwest Pacific Area, Volume II – Part I". Reports of General MacArthur. Archived from the original on 25 January 2008.
