= Staff of life =

The term staff of life may refer to:

- Among Western Eurasian (Caucasian) people, staff of life is a poetic and cultural term for bread or other staple foods.
- It is the name of one of the chapters of Patti Smith's book, The Coral Sea.

== See also ==
- Star of life, the symbol used by many emergency medical services.
- Staff of Aesculapius, a serpent-entwined rod wielded by the Greek god Asclepius, a deity associated with healing and medicine.
