= USS S-21 =

S-class submarine of the United States

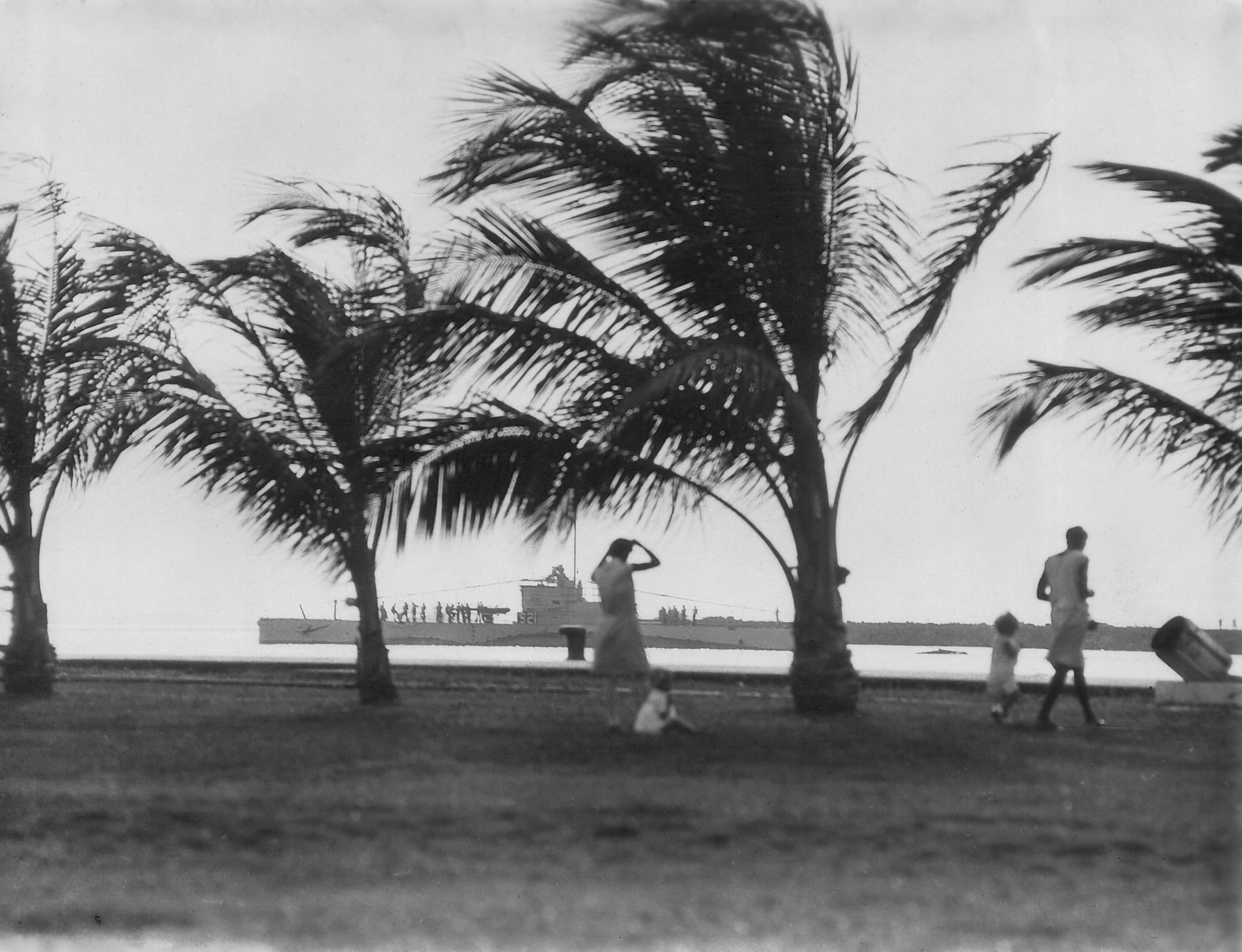
- USS S-21 (SS-126) at Coco Solo, Panama Canal Zone, c. 1927

History

United States
- Name: S-21
- Builder: Fore River Shipyard, Quincy, Massachusetts
- Cost: $677,622.75 (hull and machinery)
- Laid down: 19 December 1918
- Launched: 18 June 1920
- Sponsored by: Mrs. Gladys Baxter
- Commissioned: 24 August 1921
- Decommissioned: 31 March 1922
- Commissioned: 14 September 1923
- Decommissioned: 14 September 1942
- Identification: Hull symbol: SS-126; Call sign: NINK
- Fate: Transferred to United Kingdom, 14 September 1942

United Kingdom
- Name: P.553
- Acquired: 14 September 1942
- Fate: Returned to the US Navy, 11 July 1944; Sunk as target, 23 March 1945

General characteristics
- Class & type: S-18-class submarine
- Displacement: 930 long tons (945 t) surfaced; 1,094 long tons (1,112 t) submerged
- Length: 219 feet 3 inches (66.83 m)
- Beam: 20 ft 8 in (6.30 m)
- Draft: 17 ft 3 in (5.26 m)
- Installed power: 1,200 brake horsepower (895 kW) diesel; 2,375 hp (1,771 kW) electric
- Propulsion: 2 × NELSECO diesel engines; 2 × Ridgway Dynamo & Engine Company electric motors; 2 × 60-cell batteries; 2 × Propellers
- Speed: 14.5 knots (26.9 km/h; 16.7 mph) surfaced; 11 kn (20 km/h; 13 mph) submerged
- Range: 3,420 nmi (6,330 km; 3,940 mi) at 6.5 kn (12.0 km/h; 7.5 mph) surfaced; 8,950 nmi (16,580 km; 10,300 mi) at 9.5 kn (17.6 km/h; 10.9 mph) surfaced with fuel in main ballast tanks; 20 hours at 5 knots (9 km/h; 6 mph) submerged
- Test depth: 200 ft (61 m)
- Capacity: 41,921 US gallons (158,690 L; 34,907 imp gal) fuel oil
- Complement: 4 officers; 34 enlisted
- Armament: 4 × 21-inch (533 mm) torpedo tubes (12 torpedoes); 1 × 4-inch (102 mm)/50-caliber

USS S-21 (SS-126) was an S-18-class submarine, also referred to as an S-1-class or "Holland"-type, of the United States Navy, in commission from 1921 to 1922 and from 1923 to 1942. In 1928, she made the first gravimetric measurements ever made aboard a US ship at sea. Prior to World War II, she operated in the Atlantic Ocean, Caribbean Sea, and Pacific Ocean, and after the United States entered the war, she operated off Panama. She was transferred to the Royal Navy as P.553 from 1942 to 1944.

== Design ==
The S-18-class had a length of 219 feet 3 inches (66.8 m) overall, a beam of 20 ft 8 in (6.3 m), and a mean draft of 17 ft 3 in (5.3 m). They displaced 930 long tons (940 t) on the surface and 1,094 long tons (1,112 t) submerged. All S-class submarines had a crew of 4 officers and 34 enlisted men, when first commissioned. They had a diving depth of 200 ft (61.0 m).

For surface running, the S-18-class were powered by two 600-brake-horsepower (447 kW) NELSECO diesel engines, each driving one propeller shaft. When submerged each propeller was driven by a 1,175-horsepower (876 kW) Ridgway Dynamo & Engine Company electric motor. They could reach 14.5 knots (26.9 km/h; 16.7 mph) on the surface and 11 kn (20 km/h; 13 mph) underwater.

The boats were armed with four 21-inch (533 mm) torpedo tubes in the bow. They carried eight reloads, for a total of twelve torpedoes. The S-18-class submarines were also armed with a single 4 in (100 mm)/50 caliber deck gun.

== Construction ==
S-21's keel was laid down on 19 December 1918, by the Bethlehem Shipbuilding Corporation's Fore River Shipyard, in Quincy, Massachusetts. She was launched on 18 August 1920, sponsored by Mrs Gladys Baxter, and commissioned on 24 August 1921.

== Service history ==
=== 1921–1928 ===
Following operations from New London, Connecticut, S-21 was decommissioned and returned to her builder, on 31 March 1922. After she was reacquired by the Navy, S-21 recommissioned at Groton, Connecticut, on 14 September 1923.

S-21 then operated off the Northeastern Coast, of the United States. She visited the Panama Canal, Saint Thomas, in the US Virgin Islands, and Trinidad, between January and April 1924. Departing New London, on 25 November 1924, she visited the Territory of Hawaii, from 27 April to 25 May 1925, before returning to New London, in July 1925. Following duty in the Panama Canal area, from February through April 1926, she visited Kingston, Jamaica, from 20 to 28 March 1927. After operating in the Panama Canal area, from February into April 1928.

==== First US gravity measurements at sea ====
A Royal Navy submarine had made the first gravity measurements at sea in 1926, and the Carnegie Institution for Science subsequently proposed that the United States take such measurements in the Caribbean Sea, using a gravimeter designed by Dr. Felix Andries Vening Meinesz. Such measurements required the stability and lack of motion only attainable at sea if taken aboard a submerged submarine. S-21 was selected for the expedition, which was arranged with assistance from the United States National Academy of Sciences, the United States Coast and Geodetic Survey, the United States Naval Observatory, which provided special chronometers necessary for the gravimetric observations, and the United States Navy Hydrographic Office. Meinesz accompanied the expedition, with Elmer B. Collins, aboard S-21, to represent the US Navy Hydrographic Office, and two Eagle-class patrol craft, Eagle 35 and Eagle 58, serving as tenders.

The expedition set out from Hampton Roads, Virginia, on 4 October 1928, and followed a route that took it to Key West, Florida; Galveston, Texas; Guantanamo Bay, Cuba; the US Virgin Islands; and Puerto Rico, with a return to Hampton Roads, on 30 November 1928. The first of 49 gravity measurement stations that S-21 occupied was at 36°56′42″N 076°19′19″W. The gravity measurements were accompanied by a sonic depth sounding with results published on a chart produced by the US Navy Hydrographic Office. The gravity measurements were used in determining the shape of the Earth, and of particular interest were significant negative gravity anomalies the expedition detected.

The results of the expedition, particularly the negative anomalies, created interest in a second US gravimetric expedition at sea, resulting in the Navy-Princeton gravity expedition to the West Indies, in 1932, using the submarine S-48, and a third measurement effort in 1936–1937, the Gravimetric Survey Expedition, using the submarine Barracuda.

=== 1929–1941 ===
After returning from her gravimetric expedition, S-21 resumed operations from New London, along the Northeast Coast of the United States. She also served in the Panama Canal area, from March to April 1929 and again from January through February 1930.

Departing New London, on 22 October 1930, S-21 transited via the Panama Canal, and California, to Pearl Harbor, in Hawaii, arriving there on 7 December 1930. From 1931 into 1938, S-21 operated from Pearl Harbor, with the period 18 November 1932 to 24 January 1934, spent in reserve.

Departing Pearl Harbor on 15 October 1938, S-21 transited via California and the Panama Canal, to the Philadelphia Navy Base, arriving on 11 December 1938. Following overhaul, she arrived at New London, on 25 March 1939. She remained at New London, with a partial crew, from 1 June 1939 until 1 September 1940, when she returned to full commission with a full crew.

=== World War II ===
The United States entered World War II, with the Japanese attack on Pearl Harbor, on 7 December 1941. On 9 December 1941, S-21 got underway from New London, bound for the Panama Canal Zone. Arriving on 19 December 1941, she conducted defensive war patrols in the Pacific Ocean approaches to the Panama Canal, through May 1942, although her second such patrol, scheduled for 24 January to 7 February 1942, was cancelled to allow her to participate in search and rescue operations for the submarine S-26, which had sunk on the night of 24 January, after the submarine chaser Sturdy accidentally rammed her when the vessels were operating without navigation lights to avoid detection by the enemy.

In June 1942, S-21 returned to New London. On 14 September, she was decommissioned and was transferred to the United Kingdom.

=== Royal Navy ===
As HMS P. 553, she served in the Royal Navy, until returned to the US Navy, at Philadelphia, on 11 July 1944.

== Disposal ==
After her return, the US Navy used S-21 as a target. She was sunk in 150 feet (46 m) of water in the Atlantic Ocean off Cape Elizabeth, Maine, on 23 March 1945.

== Awards ==
- American Defense Service Medal
- American Campaign Medal
- World War II Victory Medal

== Bibliography ==
- "Table 21 - Ships on Navy List June 30, 1919". Congressional Serial Set. U.S. Government Printing Office: 770. 1921.
- Friedman, Norman (1995). U.S. Submarines Through 1945: An Illustrated Design History. Annapolis, Maryland: Naval Institute Press. ISBN 1-55750-263-3.
- Priolo, Gary. "S-21 (SS-126)". Navsource.net.
- Hall, Anne Martin (1925). Ships of the United States navy and their sponsors, 1913-1923.
- "S-21". Dictionary of American Naval Fighting Ships. Navy Department, Naval History and Heritage Command. 1 September 2015. This article incorporates text from this source, which is in the public domain.
- Oreskes, Naomi (1994). "Weighing the Earth from a Submarine: The Gravity Measuring Cruise of the U.S.S. S-21" (PDF). History of Geophysics. Vol. 5. American Geophysical Union. Archived from the original (PDF) on 7 June 2014.
- Carter, M. S. (2002). "The 1928 Cruise of the U. S. Submarine S-21 and its Contributions to the Measurement of Gravity". AGU Spring Meeting Abstracts. 2002: U42B–06. Bibcode:2002AGUSM.U42B..06C.
- Pinsel, Marc I. (1982). 150 Years Of Service On The Seas - A Pictorial History of the U.S. Naval Oceanographic Office from 1830 to 1980. Vol. 1. Washington, D.C.: US Government Printing Office. p. 233.
- "USS S-21 (SS-126)". Hunting New England Shipwrecks.
