= Japanese destroyer Kikuzuki =

Three destroyers of Japan have borne the name Kikuzuki or Kikutsuki:

- Japanese destroyer Kikutsuki (1907), a Kamikaze-class destroyer launched in 1907 and stricken in 1930
- Japanese destroyer Kikuzuki (1926), a Mutsuki-class destroyer launched in 1926 and sunk in 1942
- JDS Kikuzuki, a Takatsuki-class destroyer launched in 1967 and decommissioned in 2003
