= R. D. Elliott =

Australian politician

R. D. Elliott CMG
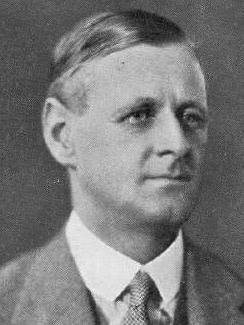

Senator for Victoria
- In office 1 July 1929 – 30 June 1935

Personal details
- Born: 28 October 1884 Kyneton, Victoria
- Died: 6 March 1950 (aged 65) Toorak, Victoria, Australia
- Party: Country (1929–34); Independent (1934–35)
- Occupation: Businessman

Robert Charles Dunlop "R. D." Elliott CMG (28 October 1884 – 6 March 1950) was an Australian politician. Born in Kyneton, Victoria, he was educated at state schools before becoming a businessman, owning country newspapers and radio stations. He was a company director, land owner and philanthropist. In 1928, he was elected to the Australian Senate as a Country Party Senator for Victoria, taking his seat in 1929. He was defeated for preselection in 1934 by former member of the House of Representatives William Gibson, and contested the Senate as an independent, winning 17.4% of the vote but failing to be elected. He was later Chairman of the Commonwealth Advisory Panel on Munitions Contracts from 1939 to 1940, and was personal assistant to the British Minister for Aircraft Production, Lord Beaverbrook, in 1940. Elliott died in 1950.

== Early life ==
Elliott was born on 28 October 1884 in Kyneton, Victoria. He was the fourth surviving child of Maria Jeanette (née Williamson) and Robert Cochrane Elliott. His mother was born in Scotland and his father in England.

Elliott attended the Kyneton State School. According to a later profile compiled by the Bread and Cheese Club, he was "educated in the rough seas of hard experience, having left State School to earn a living at 11½ years of age". His father had worked as a grocer. Elliott moved to Melbourne after leaving school and began working as a messenger boy at an office on Queen Street, Melbourne. He later worked as a clerk for an insurance company and for the Royal Bank of Australia. He was a lieutenant in the Militia from 1905 to 1911.

== Business career ==
After a trip to Britain and the United States, Elliott returned to Australia as an agent for British businesses. He amassed a substantial number of company directorships across various industries, serving on the boards of roofing manufacturer Arabic Co. Pty Ltd; millinery firm Stoddart, Fitcher & Millist Pty Ltd; stationery firm Spicers & Detmold Ltd; seed merchant Watters & Sons Pty Ltd; and the Australian division of the Yorkshire Insurance Company. He was a managing director of the Australian division of Armstrong Whitworth, which in 1927 became the Civil Engineering Construction Co. Pty Ltd. In that capacity he was involved with bridge construction at Mildura and several hydroelectric schemes, including the Nymboida Power Station in New South Wales, the Rubicon Hydroelectric Scheme in Victoria, and the Waddamana Power Stations in Tasmania.

=== Elliott Newspaper Group ===
In 1924, Elliott formed a syndicate with Ethel Page (the wife of Country Party leader Earle Page) and Percy Stewart to acquire the Sunraysia Daily, a daily newspaper in Mildura which had been placed into receivership. He later acquired interests in a wide range of newspapers across rural New South Wales and Victoria, with his holdings becoming known as the Elliott Provincial Newspaper Group or Elliott Newspaper Group. These included the Castlemaine Mail (1932), the Shepparton Advertiser (1935), The Guardian (1938), the Western Evening News (1938), The Albury Banner (1940), the Yarrawonga Chronicle (1943), the Cobram Courier (1944), the Maryborough Advertiser (1945), the Cohuna Farmers' Weekly (1947) and the Wangaratta Chronicle (1949).

== Politics ==
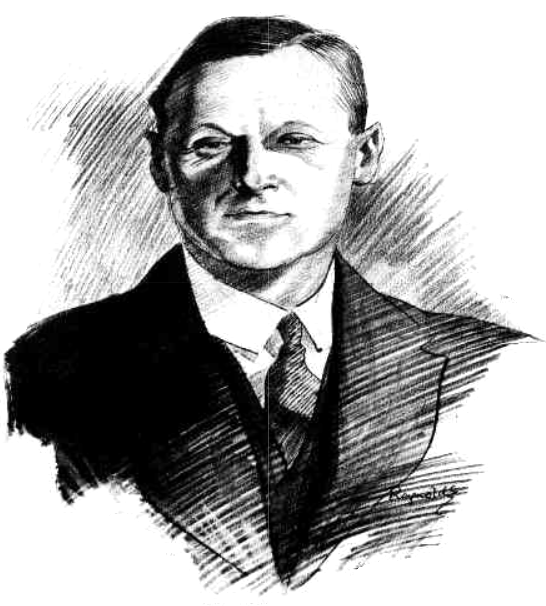
Table Talk caricature of Elliott, 1928

Elliott first stood for parliament in 1928, losing to another Country Party candidate in the Victorian Legislative Council's North Western Province.

At the 1928 federal election, Elliott was elected to a six-year Senate term beginning on 1 July 1929. He stood for the Country Party on a joint ticket with two Nationalist Party candidates.

== Personal life ==
In 1913, Elliott married Hilda Fink, the daughter of newspaper proprietor and Victorian MP Theodore Fink. They were married under the rites of the Australian Church. There were no children of the marriage.

Elliott died on 6 March 1950 at his home in Toorak, Victoria.
