= The Guardian (Swan Hill) =

Local newspaper for Swan Hill, Victoria, Australia

- Type: Local newspaper
- Format: Tabloid
- Owner: SA TODAY PTY LTD
- Founded: 1888; 138 years ago
- Headquarters: 54 McCallum Street; Swan Hill, Victoria, 3585
- Country: Australia
- Circulation: 2,955 (as of 2021)
- Sister newspapers: Sunraysia Daily; Gannawarra Times
- ISSN: 1445-0763
- Website: www.theguardian.com.au

The Guardian is a local newspaper servicing Swan Hill, Victoria, and the surrounding areas. Founded in 1888, it is published twice-weekly by the Elliott Newspaper Group.

== History ==
The Guardian was founded by A. M. Murray in 1888, its first edition being published on 11 August. The company was first sold to Messrs Rae, Everingham and Co. in 1891, who then sold the paper to Angus Knox Chapman and William Smith the following year.

When Smith retired in 1927, Chapman took full control, running the paper with his wife, Caroline.

In 1937, following the death of Angus Knox Chapman in January of that year, Caroline Chapman sells the newspaper to the Elliot Newspaper Group in December.

In 2013, the newspaper's website experienced an increase of visitors due to the launch of the British Guardian's Australian website.

On 24 March 2020, Elliott Newspaper Group announced that due to the coronavirus pandemic, it would cease publishing its newspapers until further notice, effective from the following week. The Guardian resumed publication on 1 May as a weekly publication released on Fridays. A Tuesday edition was added on 2 March 2021.

In September 2025 the paper's ownership transitioned to SA Today Pty Ltd part of the Star News Group..
