= Zara Bate =

Australian fashion entrepenuer (1909–1989)

Dame Zara Bate DBE
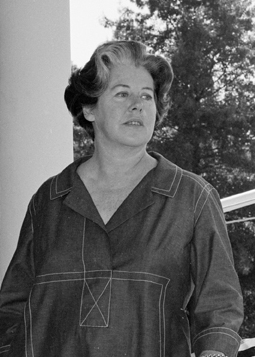
- Zara Holt in 1965

Spouse of the Prime Minister of Australia
- In role 26 January 1966 – 17 December 1967
- Preceded by: Pattie Menzies
- Succeeded by: Bettina Gorton

Personal details
- Born: Zara Kate Dickins; 10 March 1909 Kew, Victoria, Australia
- Died: 14 June 1989 (aged 80) Gold Coast, Queensland, Australia
- Resting place: Sorrento Cemetery
- Spouses: James Fell (m. 1935; div. 1946) Harold Holt (m. 1946; died 1967) Jeff Bate (m. 1969; died 1984)
- Children: 3
- Occupation: Clothier and bon vivant

Dame Zara Kate Bate DBE (née Dickins; previously Fell and Holt; 10 March 1909 – 14 June 1989) was an Australian fashion entrepreneur. She was best known as the wife of Harold Holt, who was prime minister of Australia from 1966 until his disappearance in 1967.

== Early life ==
Bate was born Zara Kate Dickins on 10 March 1909 at her parents' home in Kew, Victoria. She was the second of four children born to Violet (née MacDonald) and Sydney Dickins. She was of Irish and Scottish descent, her mother being born in Scotland.

Bate's father was a successful businessman. The family owned a Grégoire motorcar and employed a cook, parlour maid and governess. She was educated at home until about the age of 10, which she "remembered with distaste" and "remained convinced that such an education was a poor preparation for school and life". In 1919, Bate began attending Ruyton Girls' School. She left school in 1925 at the age of 16, after completing her final year of secondary education at Toorak College. She was first introduced to her future husband Harold Holt in early 1926, through a university student she was dating.

== Career ==
In 1929, aged 19, Bate and her friend Betty James opened a dress shop named "Magg" on Little Collins Street, funded by a loan of £150 (equivalent to $14,000 in 2022) from her father. The shop was originally based in an upstairs room, but soon moved down the street into an old blacksmith's shop which they renovated. She and James were featured in the women's section of The Herald as "two well-known Melbourne girls who have joined forces and gone into business", and she later recalled that she was the only girl from her class at Toorak College to have "gone into trade". After about a year, James left the partnership to marry architect Roy Grounds. Bate carried on alone for another year, becoming exhausted by her work of purchasing fabric and designing, sewing and fitting dresses. Her mother eventually insisted that she close the shop. Upon liquidating her stock she ended up with a profit of £1,500 (equivalent to $156,000 in 2022), which she used to fund a trip around the world.

Bate worked in marketing for her father's food manufacturing business during World War II, after separating from her first husband. She designed labels and advertisements for its Tandaco trademark, incorporating plastic recycled from munitions factories into its packaging. In May 1949, Bate resumed her partnership with Betty Grounds, opening a new Magg shop in Toorak. She was the head designer while Grounds looked after the business aspects. The business was immediately successful, benefiting from strong interest in designer wear after the end of wartime clothing rationing. It employed up to 50 people, with a boutique in Melbourne's Myer Emporium and a second shop at Double Bay in Sydney. Magg was later managed by Bate's daughter-in-law Caroline Holt before being sold off in 1976. In 1979 Bate was appointed as chair of Yves Saint Laurent's Australian subsidiary.

A collection of Bate's dresses is held by the National Gallery of Victoria. In 1964 The Canberra Times reported that she regarded her "greatest fashion triumph" as a mother-of-pearl silk skimmer dress worn by Tania Verstak, the winner of the Miss International 1962 pageant. She designed the Australian women's uniform for the 1968 Summer Olympics in Mexico City, providing one design in "wattle yellow" for official use and another in "Olympic green" crimplene for casual wear. In 1966, Bate was said to favour monochromatic "total look" dresses that were well-cut and "strongly styled". She praised the miniskirt style that Jean Shrimpton had controversially introduced to Australia the previous year, although noting that it did not suit all figures, and expressed her disdain for hats.

== First marriage and children ==
Her first husband was Colonel James Fell, by whom she had three sons, Nicholas (1937) and twins Sam and Andrew (1939). Their marriage broke down soon after the birth of the twins. They divorced, and in 1946 she married Harold Holt, a Liberal Party politician. He legally adopted her children and gave them his surname. Tom Frame's biography The Life and Death of Harold Holt reveals that Holt was the twins' biological father.

== Second marriage and public life ==
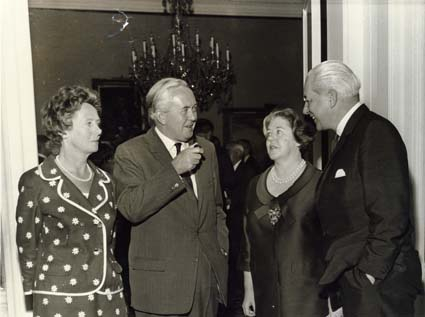
The Holts meeting with British prime minister Harold Wilson and Mrs Wilson in 1967.

Harold Holt was a member of Robert Menzies' cabinet continuously from 1949, becoming deputy Liberal leader in 1956 and Treasurer in 1958. When Menzies retired in January 1966, Holt became Prime Minister. Zara brought a new style and prominence to the role of prime minister's wife. According to Diane Langmore, the author of Prime Ministers' Wives (published 1992), Zara Holt "was the only one of the prime ministers' wives to have been a successful businesswoman. No intellectual, and not particularly introspective, she had common sense and a lack of pretension which endeared her to many. [...] The tragedies of life did not make her bitter or cynical; she retained an openness and warmth until her death."

In December 1967, Harold Holt disappeared while swimming near Portsea, Victoria; his body was never recovered.

Zara Holt was created a Dame Commander of the Order of the British Empire in the Queen's Birthday Honours of June 1968, for "devotion to the public interest". In 1968 Dame Zara published My Life and Harry: An autobiography.

== Later life ==
On 19 February 1969, Dame Zara Holt married Jeff Bate, a farmer, Liberal politician and member of the Bate family of Tilba. She then became known as Dame Zara Bate. It was the third marriage for both of them. In the early 1970s, Dame Zara promoted Maxwell House instant coffee and Amana microwave ovens and refrigerators in television commercials. After Jeff Bate's death in 1984, Dame Zara retired to the Gold Coast, where she died in 1989 at age 80.

Dame Zara was buried at Sorrento Cemetery, in the seaside suburb of the same name. Sorrento Cemetery is the closest cemetery to Cheviot Beach, the site from which Holt disappeared.

== Sources ==
- Zara Kate Bate at The Australian Women's Register
- Jeff Bate entry – Members of the NSW Parliament

Honorary titles
Preceded by Pattie Menzies	Spouse of the Prime Minister of Australia; 26 January 1966 – 17 December 1967	Succeeded by Bettina Gorton
