= Sunraysia Daily =

Local newspaper in Sunraysia, Victoria, Australia

- Type: Daily newspaper
- Format: Tabloid
- Owner: SA TODAY PTY LTD
- Editor: Alistair Finlay
- Founded: 1920; 106 years ago
- Headquarters: 25 Deakin Ave; Mildura, Victoria
- Country: Australia
- Circulation: 5,154 (as of 2021)
- ISSN: 1326-8759
- Website: www.sunraysiadaily.com.au

The Sunraysia Daily is a local newspaper in the north-western Sunraysia region of Victoria, Australia, it is published on Tuesday, Friday, and Saturday. From its first publication in 1920 until 14 September 2007, it was published in broadsheet format, changing to tabloid-size the following day.

== History ==
The newspaper was formed by the amalgamation of three newspapers, the Mildura Cultivator, the Mildura Telegraph and Darling and Lower Murray Advocate (established 9 May 1913) and the Merbein Irrigationist, (established 5 November 1919). Its first editor was Harry J. Stephens, and the first edition was produced on 2 October 1920.

In 1924, after a period in receivership, the Daily was acquired by New Sunraysia Daily Pty. Ltd., a syndicate of several leading Country Party figures including R. D. Elliott, Ethel Page (wife of Country Party leader Earle Page) and Percy Stewart. Elliott assumed control and later incorporated it into his Elliott Newspaper Group.

According to the Australian Newspaper History Group, it was one of Australia's last remaining regional broadsheets.

Australian entertainer John-Michael Howson was employed at the Sunraysia Daily as a cadet reporter early in his career.

Editor Lyall Corless led the format change from broadsheet to tabloid. Lyall is a former cadet at the Sunraysia Daily and returned to his Mildura roots in 2007 with extensive experience overseas and in leadership roles on some of Australia's biggest metropolitan mastheads.

Kieran Iles, formerly of the Mount Gambier Border Watch, became editor in January 2009. The newspaper operates out of premises in Deakin Avenue in Mildura where there are more than 60 staff working to put the newspaper together.

== Pandemic closure ==
On 24 March 2020, Elliot Newspaper Group managing director Ross Lanyon announced the paper would close and staff would be stood down from the following weekend, 28 March.

Staff would also be stood down at other Elliot Newspaper Group mastheads: Sunraysia Life (which published weekly), the tri-weekly Swan Hill Guardian, the bi-weekly Gannawarra Times at Kerang and the Loddon Times in the Loddon Mallee.

Lanyon said the COVID-19 pandemic had wiped out advertising revenue, which accounted for 70 per cent of the paper's income.

On 30 March 2020, the federal government announced the JobKeeper package. Under JobKeeper, eligible businesses were given a wage subsidy of $1,500 per fortnight per employee to retain employees whose work had been reduced or cut due to the pandemic.

ENG management informed employees they could return to work and would receive the JobKeeper payment while the paper published on a reduced schedule.

Not all employees were able to return, and not all those who did not return were replaced. Some had travelled interstate to spend time with family when the stand down notice was issued, and others had found new work.

Before the closure, the paper published a commemorative book celebrating 100 years of serving the Sunraysia community (1920–2020). The inside-back cover of the book showed the paper had 49 employees at the time of publication. Of those, 14 were editorial staff: nine journalists, two sub-editors, two photographers and editor Jason Shields.

As of 20 November 2022, the editorial staff was down to 10: six journalists, two sub-editors, one photographer and editor Jason Shields. Just five of those staff had been part of the pre-pandemic cohort.

On 29 June 2020, the federal government under Liberal prime minister Scott Morrison announced more than 100 regional newspaper publishers and broadcasters would be eligible for a share of $50m in funding to provide regional news services over the next 12 months. Elliott Newspaper Group was advised it was eligible for funding through program, which was known as Public Interest News Gathering.

In early 2021, the paper resumed printing on a Monday, bringing its weekly publication schedule to four days: Monday, Wednesday, Friday and Saturday.

An investigation by Guardian Australia revealed in December 2021 the government conducted a federal seat analysis of the PING grants to determine which seats would benefit from the program. The Mildura office of the paper is in the federal electorate of Mallee, held in 2020 by National Party MP Anne Webster. Across the river, the NSW readership of the paper are in the electorate of Farrer, held in 2020 by Liberal Party MP Sussan Ley.

In September 2025 the paper's ownership transitioned to SA Today Pty Ltd part of the Star News Group.

== See also ==
- List of newspapers in Australia
- Jack De Garis
