= Bettina Gorton =

Wife of Australian Prime Minister John Gorton (1915–1983)

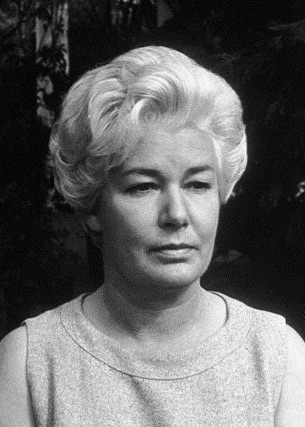
- Gorton in 1970

Spouse of the Prime Minister of Australia
- In role 10 January 1968 – 10 March 1971
- Preceded by: Dame Zara Holt
- Succeeded by: Sonia McMahon

Personal details
- Born: Bettina Edith Brown; 23 June 1915 Great Barrington, Massachusetts, U.S.
- Died: 2 October 1983 (aged 68) Acton, Canberra, Australia
- Spouse: John Gorton (m. 1935)
- Children: 3
- Education: Australian National University

Bettina Edith Gorton, Lady Gorton (née Brown; 23 June 1915 – 2 October 1983) was an American-born Australian academic who was best known as the first wife of John Gorton, the 19th Prime Minister of Australia. She was born in Portland, Maine, and met her husband while studying in France. They married in 1935. She developed an interest in South-East Asian culture relatively late in life, learning to speak Malay and Javanese and completing her first university degree at the age of 50. She was involved with a long-running Australian National University project to compile a Malay–English dictionary, although she curtailed her involvement during her husband's prime ministership (1968–1971).

== Early life ==
Gorton was born Bettina Edith Brown in Great Barrington, Massachusetts, USA, in 1915 to Arthur A. Brown, the president of an American bank in Cuba, and Grace M. Brown (née Whitaker). Her father died when she was two years old and her mother returned to her home state of Maine. She attended Bangor High School and the University of Maine, although she did not graduate from the latter.

== Marriage ==
In 1933 she was studying languages at the Sorbonne in Paris, and was taken for a holiday to Spain by her brother, Arthur Brown, where they shared a cottage with John Gorton, an Australian friend of Arthur from Oxford University. She married Gorton on 15 February 1935, at St Giles Church, Oxford, and after his studies were finished they returned to his father's orchard near Kerang, Victoria. Her mother Grace Brown came to live with them, and she later revealed that her son Arthur, Bettina's brother and John Gorton's closest friend from Oxford, was a card-carrying member of the Communist Party.

They had a daughter, Joanna in 1937, and two sons, Michael in 1938 and Robin in 1941. During John's war service, Bettina ran the farm and raised the children. He entered Federal Parliament in 1950, as a Senator for Victoria, and was often away in Canberra on parliamentary business. They moved to Canberra in 1958 when he was appointed a minister in the government of Robert Menzies.

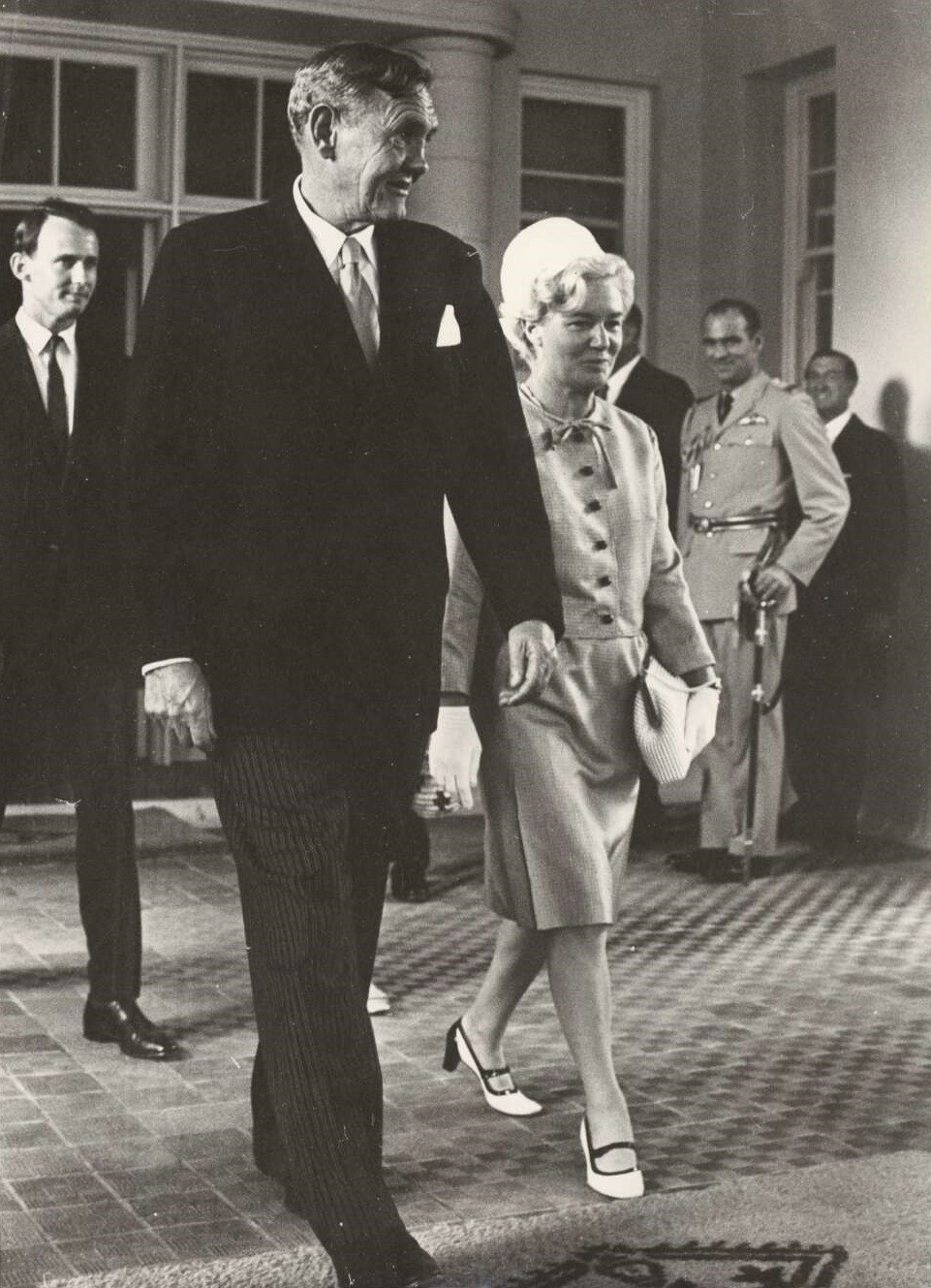
John and Bettina Gorton, c. 1968

In 1958, in a widely publicised court case, the novelist Jean Campbell (the mistress of John Gorton's father, who had died in 1936) sued Bettina for shares in the family company. Campbell alleged that Gorton senior had given the shares to her. The judge ruled in favour of Bettina Gorton.

== Wife of the prime minister ==
In 1968, John Gorton became Prime Minister and they moved into The Lodge. Bettina was the first foreign-born prime minister's wife since Dame Mary Cook (1913–1914). She oversaw a number of restoration projects, and also arranged for the building of the prominent white brick security wall around the property, and established a garden of Australian native plants in the grounds. The indigenous garden she created at The Lodge is now named the Bettina Gorton Garden in her honour.

Bettina Gorton was generally a low-profile prime ministerial spouse, but there were some significant exceptions. Her interest in oriental studies was widely reported in South-East Asia, and her speeches during John Gorton's official prime ministerial visits to Malaysia and Singapore and her ability to converse with locals in their own languages made her very popular there. She exhibited her personal collection of batik at The Lodge, and in June 1968 gave a lecture on Indonesian art and culture for the benefit of the Canberra Press Gallery. Gough Whitlam later praised her for making a lasting and valuable contribution to Australia's relations with Indonesia.

Confusion long existed over her nationality and eligibility to vote in Australian elections. She had believed herself to be ineligible to vote, as an American citizen. However, the Australian Department of Foreign Affairs clarified in 1968 that as the wife of an Australian citizen (married in Oxford, UK in 1935) she was an Australian citizen and British subject. The convoluted chain of events resulting in her holding dual citizenship is detailed in the Australian National Archives. Bettina Gorton's other activities included officially opening Melbourne Airport at Tullamarine on 9 July 1970.

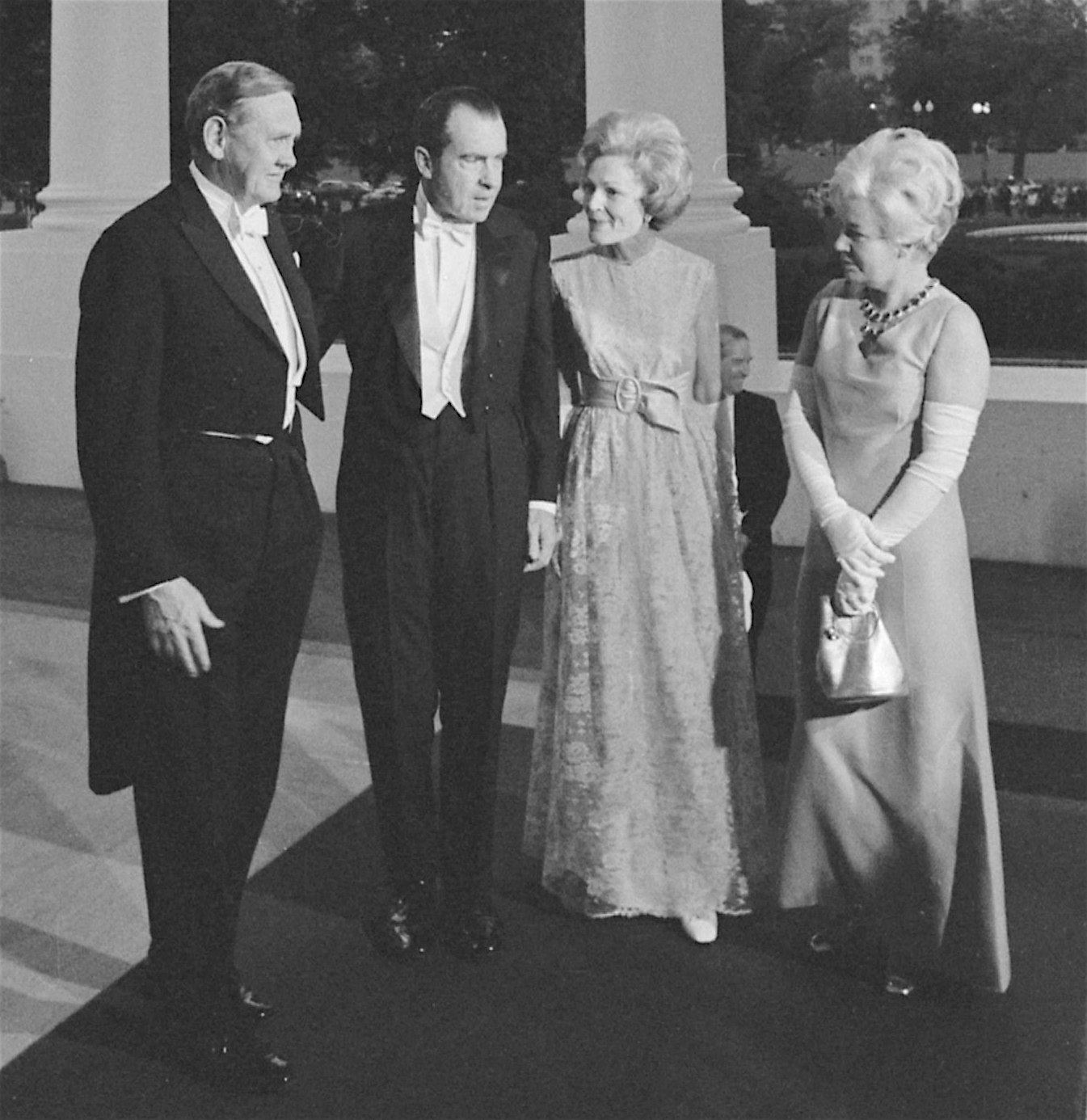
John and Bettina Gorton with Richard and Pat Nixon at the White House in 1969

In 1969 she came to her husband's defence over an incident sparked by his Liberal colleague Edward St John, a member of the House of Representatives. Gorton had attended a dinner at the American Embassy in Canberra, accompanied not by his wife, but by Geraldine Willesee, the daughter of a Labor senator, Don Willesee. St John criticised this, claiming Gorton had offended the embassy and embarrassed his party. After Labor Senator Lionel Murphy sent a message to the House of Representatives suggesting that St John's comments were an inappropriate breach of the Prime Minister's privacy, St John not only received no support from his Liberal colleagues, but he also became the focus of a poem that Bettina Gorton sent to the press gallery. She adapted a poem by William Watson, which she headed "Comment on Current Events":

He is not old, he is not young,
The Member with the Serpent's tongue,
The haggard cheek, the hungering eye,
The poisoned words that wildly fly,
The famished face, the fevered hand –
Who slights the worthiest in the land,
Sneers at the just, condemns the brave
And blackens goodness in its grave.

Edward St John was forced to resign from the Liberal Party, and the incident spelled the beginning of the end of his parliamentary career.

== Academic interests and later life ==
In 1960, Gorton accompanied her husband on an official visit to Sarawak, which sparked an interest in oriental languages and cultures. This led to her enrolling part-time at the Australian National University in 1961. She graduated with honours in Oriental Studies in 1965, and began working as a part-time research assistant on an English-Malay dictionary. In a 1968 interview, it was reported: "she can read Malay fluently, but her speech comes into the category of 'more than conversant but less than fluent': 'My vocabulary is largely to do with historical and philosophic subjects, not everyday life. But I hope to overcome this', she said."

After John Gorton left the prime ministership in 1971, Bettina resumed her work on the English-Malay dictionary, which was finally completed in 1982. She was diagnosed with cancer in 1974 but was treated successfully. She also lectured part-time at ANU, and eventually completed a Master of Arts, writing her dissertation on the Indonesian author and playwright Achdiat Karta Mihardja. She visited his birthplace in Java in 1977, conducting a series of interviews with people who had known him.

John Gorton was knighted in 1977, and Bettina became Lady Gorton. She died, aged 68, on 2 October 1983, at Royal Canberra Hospital. Her husband remarried in 1993, dying in 2002.

Honorary titles
| Preceded by Zara Bate | Spouse of the Prime Minister of Australia; 10 January 1968 – 10 March 1971 | Succeeded by Sonia McMahon |
