= Sonia McMahon =

Australian socialite and philanthropist (1932–2010)

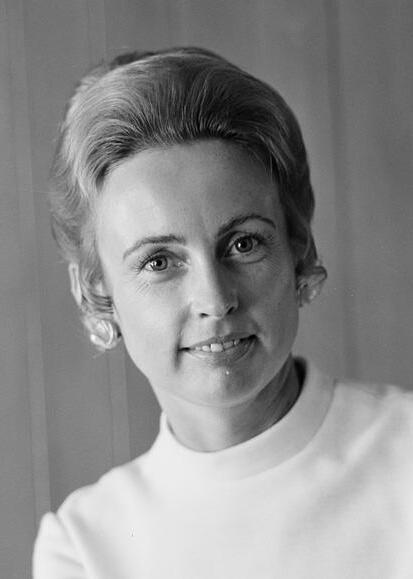
- McMahon c. 1971

Spouse of the Prime Minister of Australia
- In role 10 March 1971 – 5 December 1972
- Preceded by: Bettina Gorton
- Succeeded by: Margaret Whitlam

Personal details
- Born: Sonia Rachel Hopkins; 1 August 1932 Strathfield, New South Wales, Australia
- Died: 2 April 2010 (aged 77) Darlinghurst, New South Wales, Australia
- Spouse: Sir William McMahon (m. 1965; died 1988)
- Children: 3, including Julian McMahon

Sonia Rachel, Lady McMahon (née Hopkins; 1 August 1932 – 2 April 2010), was an Australian socialite and philanthropist. She was the wife of Sir William McMahon, who served as Prime Minister of Australia from 1971 to 1972 and the mother of actor Julian McMahon.

== Early life and education ==
McMahon was born at Borambil 86 Redmyre Road, Strathfield, New South Wales. She was the daughter of Rachel May Lilla (née Matchett) and William Edward Hopkins and grand daughter of grazier William G. Matchett. Matchett was one of Australia's wealthiest men and his estate was valued at £356,831 after his death in 1932, the year McMahon was born. She grew up in Strathfield and Killara, with her parents. Educated at Methodist Ladies' College, Burwood and Ravenswood School for Girls, Gordon, she trained in Chiropractic as a teenager.

== Career and marriage to William McMahon ==
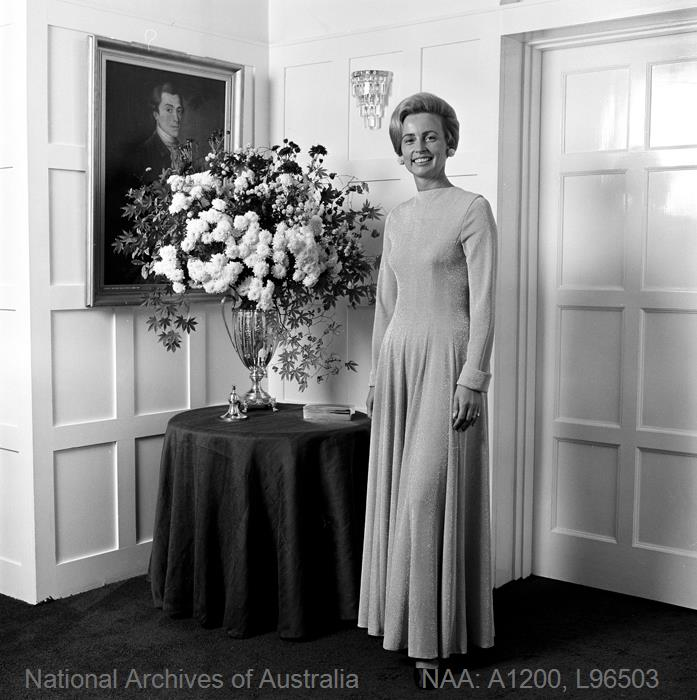
McMahon in The Lodge in 1971

Sonia Hopkins worked as an occupational therapist until 1965, when she married William (better known as Billy) McMahon, an aspiring politician in Sir Robert Menzies' government. She was 32; he was 57. It was the only marriage for both. He became Prime Minister in 1971.

Later that year, Sonia McMahon made world headlines after being photographed at the White House wearing a revealing dress in the company of her husband and United States president Richard Nixon. The white full-length dress featured see-through slits down both sides. The Washington Post described the dress as one of the most talked about items of clothing ever to be worn to the White House. In later years (then Lady McMahon) she spoke to her biographer, commenting that her husband chose the dress and that it had "certainly made an impact".

As a prime ministerial spouse from March 1971 to December 1972, McMahon organised for a nanny to look after the children at the family home in the Sydney suburb of Bellevue Hill, while she lived with her husband at The Lodge, Canberra, attending official duties. In an interview with her biographer, McMahon said: "It was a hard decision. I loved being with Bill and I loved being a mum. But I knew I had to make a decision, and I chose to be with my husband."

William McMahon was knighted in 1977 and she became Lady McMahon, although was often still referred to as simply Sonia McMahon. She became a widow in 1988 and in the ensuing years she continued her philanthropic activities. She became a board member and patron of many charities, including the National Brain Foundation, the Sydney Children's Hospital Foundation, the Australian Cancer Research Foundation, the Microsearch Foundation and Australia's Sudden Infant Death Syndrome association.

== Health issues ==
On 22 February 2009, McMahon was seriously injured after slipping on the stairs of a luxury pleasure boat owned by her friend, Paul Ramsay. She was taken to St Vincent's Hospital, Sydney suffering broken ribs, punctured lung and multiple other bone fractures.

McMahon, who also had cancer, was admitted to intensive care in March 2010 to undergo a procedure to clear her lungs of fluid. While in hospital, Lady McMahon had been preparing for an appearance at the Golden Slipper horse racing event at Rosehill Gardens Racecourse on 2 April.

== Death and legacy ==
McMahon died aged 77 on 2 April 2010, in Sydney's St Vincent's Private Hospital; her three children were by her side. Tributes emerged from throughout the country from the Sydney social scene and from each side of the Australian political divide. Leader of the Opposition Tony Abbott said, "She added grace and colour to our national life. We will all miss her. Our hearts go out to her family on this sad day". Prime Minister Kevin Rudd described Lady McMahon as a "distinguished representative of Australia ... this is a day of great sadness".

Media outlets noted her work in contributing to the community by attending fundraisers for charity and different organisations including being on the board of the Sydney Children's Hospital as well as for her complete loyalty to her husband. Lady McMahon's estate has been estimated to be worth $30 million in 2010, made up of real estate throughout New South Wales, which she inherited from her late husband.

== See also ==
- Spouse of the Prime Minister of Australia

Honorary titles
Preceded by Bettina Gorton	Spouse of the Prime Minister of Australia; 10 March 1971 – 5 December 1972	Succeeded by Margaret Whitlam
