= Ethel Page =

Wife of Sir Earle Page

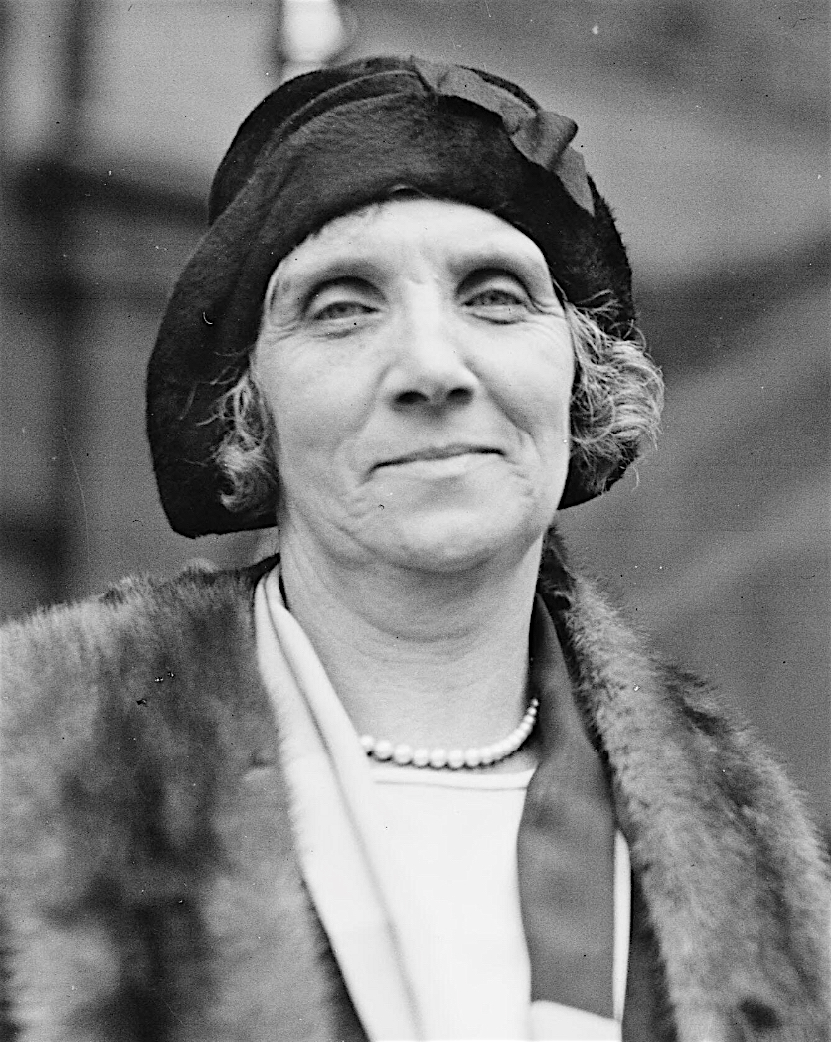
- Page circa 1930s

Spouse of the Prime Minister of Australia
- In role 7 April 1939 – 26 April 1939
- Prime Minister: Sir Earle Page
- Preceded by: Dame Enid Lyons
- Succeeded by: Pattie Menzies

Personal details
- Born: Ethel Esther Blunt; 20 September 1875 Sydney, New South Wales, Australia
- Died: 26 May 1958 (aged 82) Grafton, New South Wales, Australia
- Spouse: Earle Page (m. 1906)
- Children: 5

Ethel Esther Page (née Blunt; 20 September 1875 – 26 May 1958) was an Australian nurse and political figure as the first wife of Earle Page, the 11th prime minister of Australia. She supported her husband during his long political career, though never living in Canberra, and was politically active herself, serving on the state executive of the Country Party and as president of its women's section. She was also involved in various community organisations.

== Early life ==
Ethel Esther Blunt was born in Sydney on 20 September 1875, the oldest of eight children born to Mary (née Ritchie) and Frederick Lynch Blunt. Her father worked as a building contractor and was frequently in financial difficulties. He died in 1898, when many of her younger siblings were still children. Blunt trained as a nurse after leaving school, with the initial intention of becoming a medical missionary. She completed her training at Royal Prince Alfred Hospital (RPA), where she was top of her class, and was subsequently employed there as a senior staff nurse. She later worked briefly as a matron at Manly Hospital.

== Marriage and children ==
Blunt met her future husband Earle Page while serving as a theatre nurse at RPA; he was a medical resident there. Their first encounter came while she was assisting him with an unorthodox fire cupping procedure on a kidney patient. He accidentally threw a lit piece of alcohol-soaked paper onto her dress, causing it to catch fire. He quickly threw a nearby blanket over her, and she escaped with only minor burns.

Page—who was almost five years her junior—soon began courting her, and in 1904 convinced her to become the matron at his new private hospital in Grafton. They married in Sydney on 18 September 1906, and would have five children together—Mary (b. 1909), Earle Jr. (b. 1910), Donald (b. 1912), Iven (b. 1914), and Douglas (b. 1916).

== Public life ==
Page's husband was elected to federal parliament in 1919, and in 1921 became the leader of the fledgling Country Party. They moved their primary residence from Grafton to Sydney, which gave her the chance to become more socially and politically active. She was the founder of the Women's Country Club, a social club for women visiting Sydney from country towns. She was involved in the Feminist Club of New South Wales, but later left to become a founding member of the more activist United Associations of Women, serving on its executive. Page largely shared her husband's political views and, in 1923, was elected as the inaugural president of the Women's Country Party. It was initially an independent organisation modelled on the Australian Women's National League, but was later integrated into the main party. She subsequently represented the women's section on the Country Party's state executive for seven years.

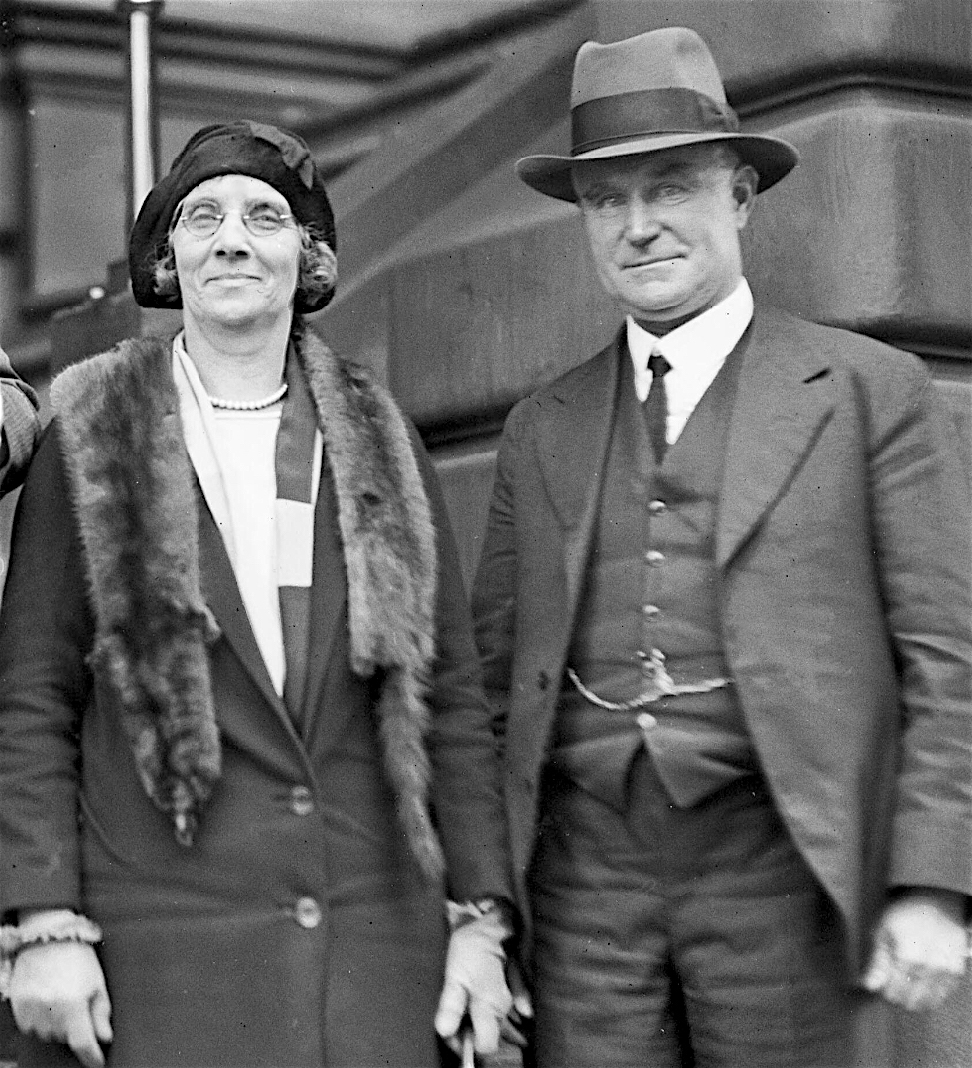
Ethel and Earle Page

Page was a delegate to national conferences of the Country Women's Association (CWA) and the National Council of Women, and served as a state vice-president of the latter. In the CWA, she was one of the leaders of a faction that advocated the open endorsement of Country Party policies; this was somewhat controversial given the organisation's nominal nonpartisan nature. Page occasionally wrote articles for The Land, a newspaper focusing on rural matters. In 1924, apparently as a surrogate for her husband, she became a one-third owner of the Sunraysia Daily, the main newspaper in Mildura, Victoria; her co-owners were Robert Elliott and Percy Stewart. She served as a director of its holding company until 1932, when she sold her shares to Elliott.

In 1933, Page's oldest son, Earle Jr. was killed by a lightning strike, aged 22. Her husband wrote in his memoirs: "when my wife heard the news that her son would return no more, a brain stroke affecting the movements of her hands descended on her, and ever after, until her death twenty-five years later, affected her [...] despite this affliction, she gallantly continued to play her usual active part in public". Prior to the 1937 federal election, Page made a 15-minute speech that was broadcast on ABC Radio National, an attempt to appeal to women voters. Despite her husband's long career in politics, she never lived in the national capital, generally only visiting for the state opening of parliament. Her husband stayed at the Hotel Canberra during parliamentary sittings, as was common at the time. Following the death in office of Joseph Lyons in 1939, he served as caretaker prime minister for 19 days. Page's only public appearances as the prime minister's wife came when she and her husband attended Lyons' memorial service in Sydney and funeral in Devonport, Tasmania. However, she had previously appeared at a number of public functions during her husband's numerous stints as acting prime minister.

Page died at Grafton Base Hospital on 27 May 1958, aged 82, after several years of ill health. Her husband remarried the following year to Jean Thomas, his long-time secretary; he lived only another two years.

Honorary titles
Preceded by Enid Lyons	Spouse of the Prime Minister of Australia; 7 April 1939 – 26 April 1939	Succeeded by Pattie Menzies
