= Earle Page College =

Residential college in Armidale, New South Wales, Australia

Earle Page College / Austin Page College
- University of New England
- Location: Meredith Road, Armidale, New South Wales
- Coordinates: 30.4970992°S 151.6398015°E
- Full name: Earle Page College/ Austin and Earle Page College
- Motto in English: "Each Prove Yourself"
- Established: 1963; 63 years ago
- Named for: Earle Page
- Master: Mr Luke Fowler
- Residents: 143
- Website: Homepage; Alumni Homepage

Earle Page College is a residential college of the University of New England located in Armidale, New South Wales, Australia. The college accommodates roughly 300 students.

== History ==
The college is named after former prime minister Earle Page, who was the first Chancellor of the University of New England in 1954. It originated in 1963 as an all-male set of houses in town. Most Page students who were living in town had to travel to the campus for all meals by public transport. After its opening, students slowly moved into the current buildings. EPC began as an all-male college; however, females have been admitted since 1973. In 2021, EPC merged with Austin College, moving into the buildings at Austin College. Since the merge it has been called Austin and Earle Page College or simply as Austin Page.

=== Memorable college events ===
- 1963 - Earle Page College was opened as a men's college
- 1967 - The motto of the college, "Each Prove Himself", was created.
- 1968 - First "Iskra" published.
- 1972 - A referendum was held in the college to decide whether the college should become a co-educational. The referendum was passed.
- 1973 - The first year women where admitted to college.
- 1981 - The last year freshers were required to do 'phone duty' from the single line entering college. The phone was operated by freshers who patched the calls to students on other floors. Later that year phones were installed on all floors.
- 1983 - The Ash Wednesday bushfires in Victoria for which some freshers did a 'wall sit' on their floor to raise money to send to victims.
- 1986 - Due to a huge intake for the University, over 100 students were housed in motels and hotels for most of first semester, and every available space in college was used - common rooms were separated into two section to house more members. The students living in town were brought to college for breakfast and dinner in buses, and paid the same amount as people living in college; Prime Minister Bob Hawke attended politics dinner.
- 1987 - D-Block, a block generally reserved for post grad students, overseas students and mature age students, was opened to the general college population.
- 1996 - Earle Page had so few residents they closed down D-Block for the year.
- 1997 - There was a bomb scare at Politics Dinner, which turned out to be a prank.
- 1999 - The College won both the Mary Bagnall and Presidents Trophy sporting competitions.
- 2001 - Two residents (Mary Jones & Tamar Scobie) were killed in a car accident in May and gardens in the main courtyard were built in their memory.
- 2003 - 40th Anniversary of Earle Page College.
- 2006 - College SCR member and former Pagite, Dr. Peter Hemphill, died. A memorial garden and plaque was dedicated to his memory and service to the college.
- 2007 - Earle Page College won the Mary Bagnall Trophy for only the second time in its history. The Annual College Ball was also moved out from the college grounds and held at the Armidale Ex-Services Club for the first time ever. The Annual Earle Page College Coast Run raised a record $30,000 for the Children's Medical Research Institute.
- 2008 - Earle Page College placed 1st in both the Sir Frank Kitto (SFK) and Mary Bagnall (MB) competitions, and places highly in the President's Trophy (PT) competition. Sam Loxton, of Don Bradman's 1948 Invincibles is the guest speaker at Sports Dinner, and Senator Bob Brown, leader of the Greens Party is the guest speaker at the annual Politics Dinner.
- 2009 - 30th anniversary of the Coast Run.
- 2013 - 50th anniversary of the College and 20th anniversary of the Coast Run Annual Fashion Parade extravaganza.
- 2019 - 40th Anniversary of the Coast Run. The last "Iskra" is published.
- 2020 - With the Covid pandemic occurring, residents were sent home and the college closed down for the rest of Trimester 1. At the start of Trimester 2, the college reopened and welcomed back a limited number of residents.
- 2021 - EPC merged with Austin College, moving into the buildings at Austin. From then on the college is known as Austin and Earle Page College, or Austin Page. As Austin Page, the college placed 1st in Sir Frank Kitto (SFK), Mary Bagnell (MB), and the President's trophy (PT) competitions.
- 2022 - Austin Page placed 1st in SFK, MB, and PT competitions for the second time in a row. The college successfully holds its annual musical for the first time since before the Covid pandemic began.
- 2023 - 60th Anniversary of the College. Austin Page placed 1st in SFK, MB, and PT competitions for the third time in a row.
- 2024 - Coast Run is able to go ahead for the first time since 2019. The college holds it annual musical again.

== College infrastructure ==
The college is made up of 5 blocks, each block being numbered from 1 to 5, with a total 15 floors. There is a Bot, Mid & Top floor on each block. There is not Bot 3 or Bot 1 however, as this space is taken up by the laundries and other facilities. Each floor has its own bathrooms. Attached to the blocks include 2 laundries and drying rooms, an I.T. room, a gallery, a library, an exercise room and 2 music rooms. The college also has a dining hall, with a capacity for around 400, a BBQ area, a Junior Common Room and a Senior Common Room.

When women were allowed into Page, all bathroom troughs were to be filled in, however, the men of Top 5 (previously known as Top D) protested and placed their mattresses over the door to the bathroom, preventing the work from being completed. This is the last physical attribute of the college's all male heritage.

== Pastoral and Academic Care ==
Each floor on the college is run by a Resident Fellow, who is in charge of pastoral care, these Resident Fellows are there to help guide and care for all residents on the floor and the college. These Resident Fellows are selected by a Panel of Senior Residents and College Leaders.

There is also an Academic Mentor on each floor as well. Academic Mentors are there to help the floor with any academic issues that may arise, also to provide study workshops and insightful guides to a wide range of academic disciplines.

These two Committees are run by the Senior Resident Fellow and Senior Academic Mentor, along with the President of the Junior Common Room and the three main leaders of the College.

== Inter-college competitions ==
There are two main Inter-College competitions. The "Sir Frank Kitto" competition has events such as Debating, Public Speaking, Small Music Ensemble, Arts & Craft, Performance and Theatre Sports. The "Mary Bagnall" and "Presidents Trophy" competitions are the Inter-College sporting competitions. These competitions hold a range of spots throughout the year such as Rugby 7s, Swimming Carnival, Tennis, Netball, Football, Lawn Bowls, and Hockey.

In 2006, Earle Page came 2nd in the Sir Frank Kitto competition and received respectable placings in both the males' Presidents Trophy and females' Mary Bagnall Trophy. In 2008, Page came 1st in the Sir Frank Kitto competition and achieved 1st in the Mary Bagnall Trophy and 3rd in the Presidents Trophy. In 2012, Page achieved the trifecta taking out 1st place in the Sir Frank Kitto competition, President Trophy and Mary Bagnall Trophy. Earle Page College has achieved 1st place in the Sir Frank Kitto competition for the previous 5 years.

== SCR committee ==
The members of the Senior Common Room comprise non-resident academics, University employees, towns folk and Earle Page College Alumni who support the life of the college as a whole in a variety of ways, including academic, material, social and personal.

== JCR committee ==
The Junior Common Room Committee is the peak student body, elected directly by the college residents. The committee operates through the payment of a subscription fee paid by most students, which subsidises college functions, pays for PT and MB sports, SFK competitions and an annual major project.

Positions held on the JCR committee are, President, Vice-President, Secretary, Treasurer, Media and Publications Officer, Health and Well-being Officer, Events Officer, External Officer, JCR Officer, Sound Officer. As well as two Fresher representatives.

== Formal dinners and JCR functions ==
Yearly formal dinners include:

- Introductory Dinner (Now Commencement Dinner).
- Arts Dinner (Since 2021 it has been merged with Austin College's Charities dinner, and is now called CHARTs dinner).
- Politics Dinner and Lecture
- Parents Dinner
- Sporties Dinner (Final Dinner was held in 2019).
- Valedictory Dinner

Guests at the Politics Lecture have included several prime ministers, senators, MPS and political authorities, People such as Hon. Bob Hawke, John Howard, Julia Gillard, Tony Abbott, Penny Wong, Peter Garrett, Amanda Vanstone, Philip Ruddock, Natasha Stott Despoja, and Sarah Hanson-Young have all spoken at the lecture.

Functions run by the Junior Common Room Committee include:

- Cab Ball (2019 was the final year it was held).
- Annual College Ball (Now known as Mates Ball).
- Block Functions
- Silly Season (Term 3)

The Junior Common Room Committee runs several events in O-Week which include: Aussie Night, Games Night, Trivia Night, Toga Party, Bush Dance and Surf Carnival.

== Activities ==
=== Musical ===
Every year since 1973, EPC has produced a musical over a 3 night period during Parents Weekend. The musical is completely run by the residents and the elected Musical Committee.

Past 18 years of Earle Page College/Austin Page Productions

- 2025 - Little Shop of Horrors
- 2024 - Mamma Mia the Musical
- 2022 - Twisted
- 2019 - Legally Blonde
- 2018 - Chicago
- 2017 - The Little Mermaid
- 2016 - The Adams Family
- 2015 - Grease
- 2014 - Into The Woods
- 2013 - Sweeney Todd: The Demon Barber on Fleet Street
- 2012 - Return to The Forbidden Planet
- 2011 - Little Shop of Horrors
- 2010 - Beauty and the Beast
- 2009 - Rent
- 2008 - Something Happened on the way to the Forum
- 2007 - 'Bye 'Bye Birdie
- 2006 - How to Succeed in Business Without Really Trying

=== Coast run ===
Every year since 1980 the college has conducted a charity run from Armidale to Coffs Harbour (220 km) to raise funds for charity, the Children's Medical Research Institute (CMRI). The Fundraising activities include the sale of a Discount Card for use within Armidale, an Annual Fashion Extravaganza, Charity Auction, Inter-floor sports, Coast Run Goes Bush a fun run around the UNE campus, and the run itself. In 2005, the group raised over $23,500 with the introduction of the Charity Discount Card. In 2006, its 27th year, the group raised over $25,000, which was a record for the event. In 2007 this record was broken, with over $30,000 raised over the entire year, and again broken in 2008 with over $35, 000 raised. In 2010, the committee raised $45,000.

In all over $400,000 has been raised for Children's Medical Research by this means. In 2023, Coast Run merge with the Austin College Charities, taking over the following events CHARTs dinner and the Rainbow run.

== Masters ==
- 1963–1975 - Albert Bussell
- 1976 - John Nolan (Interim Head)
- 1976–1979 - Dr. Edmund Barrington Thomas
- 1979–1988 - Allan Keith Huggins
- 1989–1991 - Carole Tisdell
- 1992–1994 - Phillip Raymont
- 1995–1999 - Gregory Eddy
- 1999–2010 - David Ward
- 2010–2011 - Andrea Gledhill
- 2012–2014 - Penny Biddle
- 2014–2015 - Jasmine Galletly
- 2015–2020 - Kathie Hunt
- 2021 - Rami Bahanas
- 2021–2022 - Ilona Mair (Interim Head)
- 2022–present - Luke Fowler
