= Cobram Courier =

Local Australian weekly newspaper

The Cobram Courier, also published as Yarroweyah, Strathmerton, Katamatite, Burramine & Berrigan News, is a weekly English language newspaper published in Cobram, Victoria, Australia.

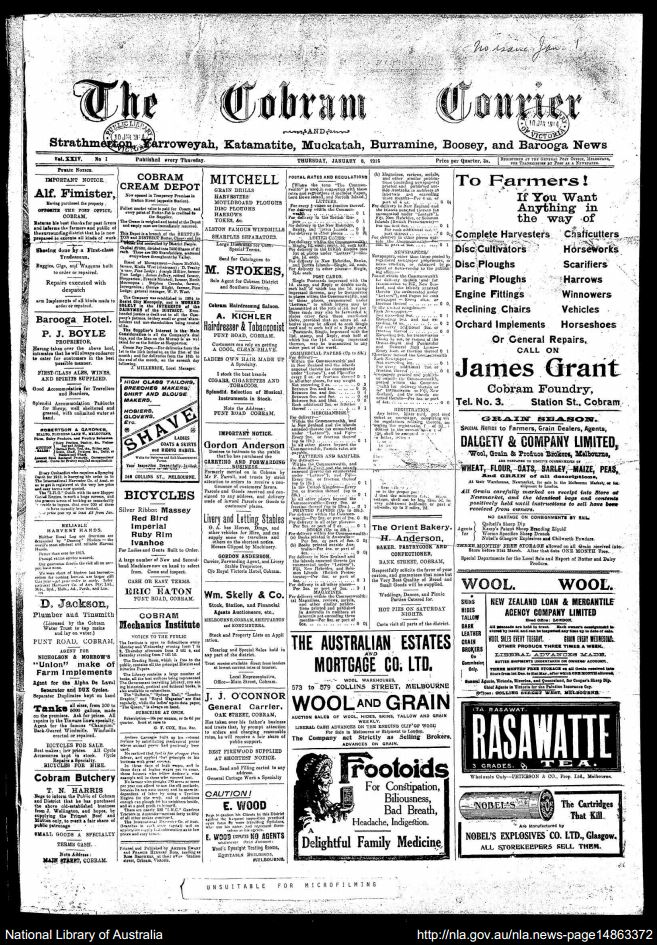
Digital image of the Cobram Courier newspaper front page, 8 January 1914

== History ==
The Cobram Courier was published from 12 September 1888 to 28 December 1995, by Victoria Heller & Marston, Cobram. From 1996, it has been published by Newsprinters, a subsidiary of McPherson Media Group.

The paper is published every Wednesday, and reports on news, community and sporting events from the townships of Cobram, Barooga, Strathmerton, Tocumwal, Katamatite and surrounding districts. The editor is Simon Ruppert

It has a circulation of 2,606 within a population of 6,308 in the prime circulation area.

== Digitalization ==
The paper has been digitalized as part of the Australian Newspapers Digitisation Program of the National Library of Australia and is available online.

== See also ==
- List of newspapers in Australia
