= Earle Page =

Prime Minister of Australia in 1939

The Right Honourable Sir Earle Page GCMG CH FRCS
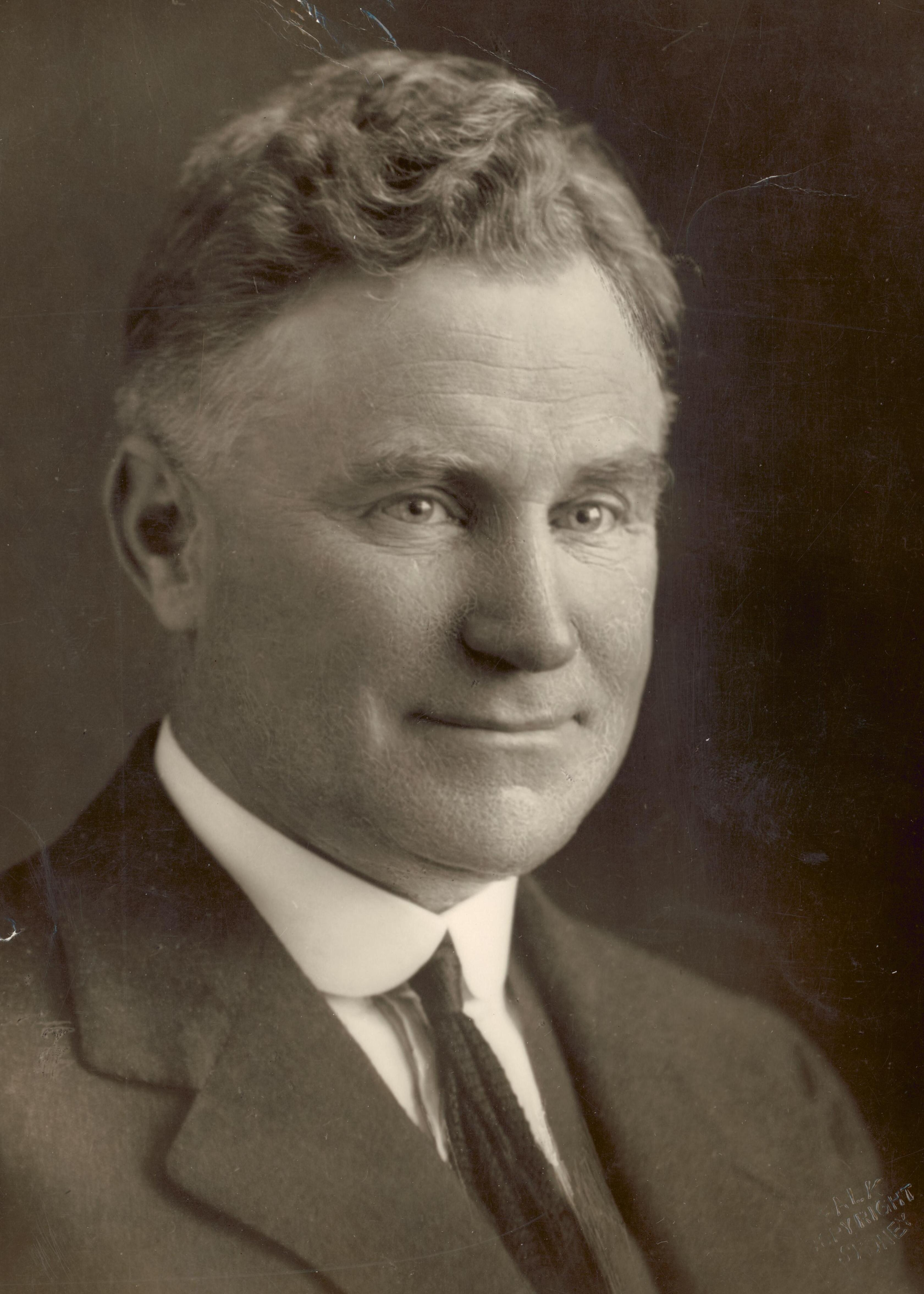
- Official portrait c. 1939

11th Prime Minister of Australia
- In office 7 April 1939 – 26 April 1939
- Monarch: George VI
- Governor-General: Lord Gowrie
- Preceded by: Joseph Lyons
- Succeeded by: Robert Menzies

2nd Leader of the Country Party
- In office 5 April 1921 – 13 September 1939
- Deputy: See list: Henry Gregory; William Fleming; William Gibson; Thomas Paterson; Harold Thorby
- Preceded by: William McWilliams
- Succeeded by: Archie Cameron

Minister for Health
- In office 19 December 1949 – 11 January 1956
- Prime Minister: Robert Menzies
- Preceded by: Nick McKenna
- Succeeded by: Donald Cameron
- In office 29 November 1937 – 7 November 1938
- Prime Minister: Joseph Lyons
- Preceded by: Billy Hughes
- Succeeded by: Harry Foll

Minister for Commerce
- In office 28 October 1940 – 7 October 1941
- Prime Minister: Robert Menzies; Arthur Fadden
- Preceded by: Archie Cameron
- Succeeded by: William Scully
- In office 9 November 1934 – 26 April 1939
- Prime Minister: Joseph Lyons; Himself
- Preceded by: Frederick Stewart
- Succeeded by: George McLeay

Treasurer of Australia
- In office 9 February 1923 – 21 October 1929
- Prime Minister: Stanley Bruce
- Preceded by: Stanley Bruce
- Succeeded by: Ted Theodore

Father of the House
- In office 28 October 1952 – 9 December 1961
- Preceded by: Billy Hughes
- Succeeded by: Eddie Ward

Member of the Australian Parliament for Cowper
- In office 13 December 1919 – 9 December 1961
- Preceded by: John Thomson
- Succeeded by: Frank McGuren

1st Chancellor of the University of New England
- In office 8 February 1955 – 1960
- Deputy: Phillip Wright
- Preceded by: Position established
- Succeeded by: Phillip Wright

Personal details
- Born: Earle Christmas Grafton Page; 8 August 1880 Grafton, Colony of New South Wales
- Died: 20 December 1961 (aged 81) Camperdown, New South Wales, Australia
- Resting place: St Andrew's Cathedral, Sydney
- Party: Country
- Spouses: Ethel Blunt (m. 1906; died 1958) Jean Thomas (m. 1959)
- Children: 5
- Relatives: Harold (brother); Rodger (brother); Robert (nephew); Geoff (grandson); Don (grandson)
- Education: Grafton Public School; Sydney Boys High School
- Alma mater: University of Sydney
- Occupation: Politician; surgeon

Military service
- Allegiance: Australia
- Branch/service: Australian Army
- Years of service: 1916–17
- Rank: Captain
- Unit: Royal Australian Army Medical Corps
- Battles/wars: World War I

Sir Earle Christmas Grafton Page (8 August 1880 – 20 December 1961) served as the 11th prime minister of Australia from 7 to 26 April 1939, in a caretaker capacity following the death of Joseph Lyons. He was the leader of the Country Party from 1921 to 1939, and was the most influential figure in its later years.

Page was born in Grafton, New South Wales. He entered the University of Sydney at the age of 15, and completed a degree in medicine at the age of 21. After completing his medical residency at Royal Prince Alfred Hospital in Sydney, he moved back to Grafton and opened a private hospital. He soon became involved in local politics, and in 1915 purchased a part-share in The Daily Examiner, a local newspaper. He also briefly was a military surgeon during World War I. Page gained prominence as an advocate of various development schemes for the Northern Rivers region, especially those involving hydroelectricity. He also helped found a movement for New England statehood.

At the 1919 Australian federal election, Page was elected to the Parliament of Australia representing the Division of Cowper. He joined the new Country Party the following year as its inaugural whip, and then replaced William McWilliams as party leader in 1921. Page opposed the economic policies of Prime Minister Billy Hughes, and when the Country Party gained the balance of power at the 1922 election, he demanded Hughes' resignation as the price for a coalition with the Nationalist Party. He was subsequently made Treasurer of Australia under the new prime minister, Stanley Bruce, serving in that role from 1923 to 1929. He had a significant degree of influence on domestic policy, with Bruce concentrating on international issues.

Page returned to cabinet after the 1934 election, when the Country Party entered a new coalition with Joseph Lyons' United Australia Party (UAP). He was appointed Minister for Commerce, and concentrated on agricultural issues. When Lyons died in office in April 1939, Page was commissioned as his successor in a caretaker capacity while the UAP elected a new leader, Robert Menzies. Page subsequently denounced Menzies and refused to serve in his cabinet, withdrawing the Country Party from the coalition, but this proved unpopular and he resigned the party leadership after a few months. The coalition was eventually reconstituted, and Page served again as Minister for Commerce under Menzies and Arthur Fadden until the government's defeat in October 1941.

Page's last major role was as Minister for Health (1949–1956) in the post-war Menzies Government. He retired from cabinet at the age of 76, and died a short time after losing his seat at the 1961 election. Page served in parliament for almost 42 years, the third longest-serving Australian parliamentarian of all time; only Menzies lasted longer as the leader of a major Australian political party. He secured his party's independence by refusing overtures to merge with the Nationalists and the UAP, and the policies that he favoured – decentralisation, agrarianism, and government support of primary industry – have remained the basis of its platform up to the present day. The coalitions that he established and maintained with Bruce and Lyons have served as a model for all subsequent coalition governments.

== Early life ==
=== Birth and family background ===
Earle Christmas Grafton Page was born in Grafton, New South Wales, on 8 August 1880. His first middle name, which he disliked, was given to him to carry on the surname of a childless relative, while his second middle name was in honour of his birthplace. Page was the fifth of eleven children born to Charles Page and Mary Johanna Haddon (Annie) Cox. His older brother Rodger was chaplain to the royal family of Tonga and his younger brother Harold was the deputy administrator of the Territory of New Guinea and a Japanese prisoner of war. Page's parents had both lived in Grafton since they were children. His mother was born in Tasmania to an English father and a Scottish mother. His father, born in London, was a successful businessman and a member of the Grafton City Council, serving a single term as mayor in 1908. The family business was a hardware manufacturing firm, which had its origins in a coachbuilding firm established in 1858 by Page's maternal grandfather, Edwin Cox. His other grandfather, James Page, arrived in Grafton in 1855, serving as the town's first schoolmaster and first town clerk.

=== Education ===
Page began his schooling at Grafton Public School, where he excelled academically. His family could not afford to send him to boarding school, as a result of financial difficulties caused by the banking crisis of 1893. Page consequently had to rely on scholarships to advance his education. He won a bursary to attend Sydney Boys High School in 1895, where he passed the university entrance exams, and the following year – aged 15 – began studying a liberal arts course at the University of Sydney. He was equal top in mathematics in his first year, and was also awarded the lucrative Struth Exhibition for "general proficiency in the arts", which allowed him to switch to medicine and covered his first four years of medical school. His role model was Grafton Smith, who had followed a similar path from Grafton Public School to university. At Sydney Medical School, Page's lecturers included William Haswell (biology), James Hill (biology), Charles Martin (physiology), Anderson Stuart (physiology), and James Wilson (anatomy). He graduated at the top of his class in 1901, with the degrees of Bachelor of Medicine (M.B.) and Master of Surgery (Ch.M.).

== Medical career ==
Page's first professional posting came before he had even been registered as a medical practitioner. Due to a shortage of doctors, he was acting superintendent of the Royal Alexandra Hospital for Children for one month. In 1902, he took up a position as a resident at the Royal Prince Alfred Hospital, serving in a variety of roles including as house surgeon under Robert Scot Skirving. During that time he contracted a near-fatal infection from a postmortem examination. He also met his future wife, nurse Ethel Blunt. Page returned to his home town in 1903, taking over a practice in South Grafton. He and two partners subsequently established a new private hospital, Clarence House Hospital, which opened in 1904 and served both Grafton and the surrounding region.

Page was a keen adopter of new technologies. In 1904, he bought what he claimed was "the first Rover car in Australia", which was powered by kerosene. He upgraded to an Itala in 1908, and had the chassis enlarged so it could be used as an ambulance. He also had an x-ray machine installed in his hospital, one of the first in Australia outside a major city. Page developed a reputation for surgical innovation, taking a number of patients from Sydney and even some from interstate. One operation that brought him particular fame was the removal of a patient's diseased lung, a procedure that had only been invented a few years previously. Page became an inaugural Fellow of the Royal Australasian College of Surgeons (FRACS) in 1927, and in 1942 was made an honorary Fellow of the Royal College of Surgeons of England (FRCS).

In February 1916, Page enlisted in the Australian Army Medical Corps, at the rank of Captain. He was chief medical officer aboard the troopship HMAT Ballarat, and was then stationed at an army hospital in Cairo for several months. He was transferred to a hospital in England in July 1916, and concluded his service as a surgical specialist at a casualty clearing station in France. Page returned to Australia in March 1917 and was discharged from the military in July 1917. Although his active involvement in medicine declined as his political career progressed, he was frequently called upon to treat his fellow MPs or parliamentary staff. This was particularly true after the federal government moved to Canberra, as the new capital had only a handful of qualified surgeons. In 1928, for instance, he performed an emergency appendectomy on Parker Moloney.

== Early political involvement ==
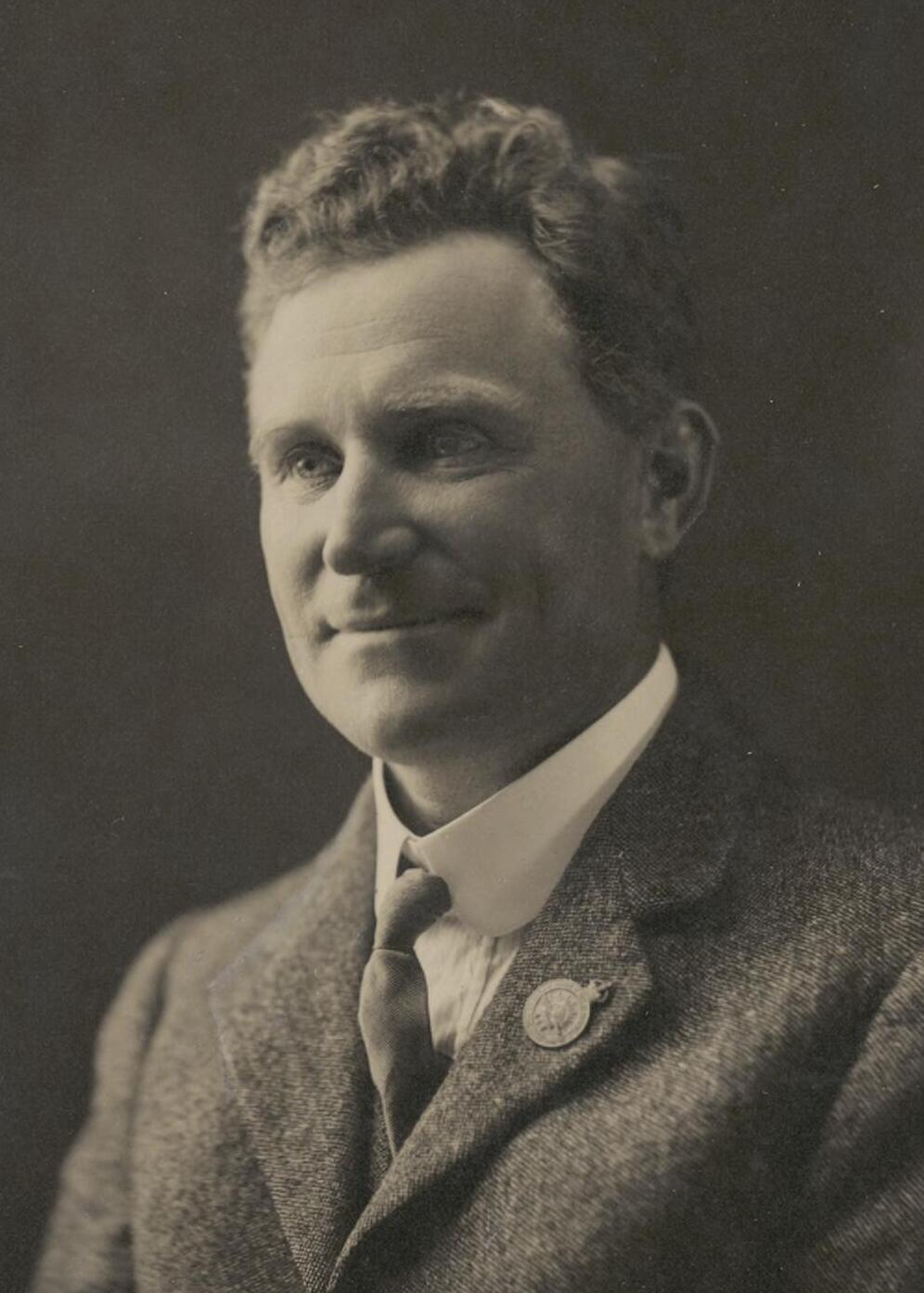
Page in about 1920

Page's medical career brought him considerable wealth, and he began investing in land. He bought several large farming properties in South East Queensland, including in Nerang, Kandanga, and the Numinbah Valley; Pages Pinnacle in the Numinbah State Forest is named after him. His entry into public life came about as a result of his passion for hydroelectricity, which he first observed in New Zealand while attending a medical convention in 1910. He believed that it could be applied to the Northern Rivers region, which was still mostly unelectrified outside of the major towns. Page was elected to the South Grafton Municipal Council in 1913, believing his position as an alderman would be useful in his lobbying efforts. However, his overtures to the state government were rebuffed. In 1915, Page was one of the founders of the Northern New South Wales Separation League, which advocated the creation of a new state in the New England region. He toured a number of towns to raise awareness of the new movement, but interest waned as a result of the ongoing war. Later that year, he was part of a syndicate that bought The Daily Examiner, the local newspaper in Grafton.

Page visited a number of hydroelectric sites in North America in 1917, on his way back from military service in France. He was elected mayor of South Grafton in 1918, serving until 1920, and also became the inaugural president of the North Coast Development League. He developed more concrete plans for a hydroelectric project on the Clarence River, and put forward various other development schemes relating to roads, railways, and ports, all of which served to raise his profile in the local district. Page was elected to the Australian House of Representatives at the 1919 federal election, defeating the sitting Nationalist MP, John Thomson in the Division of Cowper. He stood as an independent with the endorsement of the Farmers' and Settlers' Association, and after the election joined the new Country Party, along with 10 other MPs from rural seats. Page continued to advocate for hydroelectricity throughout his political career, and many such projects were built in New South Wales. However, the specific scheme he favoured for the Clarence River was never put in place, only the smaller Nymboida Power Station. Decentralisation also remained a pet project, with Page frequently arguing for New South Wales and Queensland to be divided into smaller states to aid regional development. The movement for New England statehood waned in the 1920s, but re-emerged in the 1950s; a legally binding referendum on the subject was finally held in 1967, after Page's death, but was narrowly defeated in controversial circumstances.

== Bruce–Page government ==
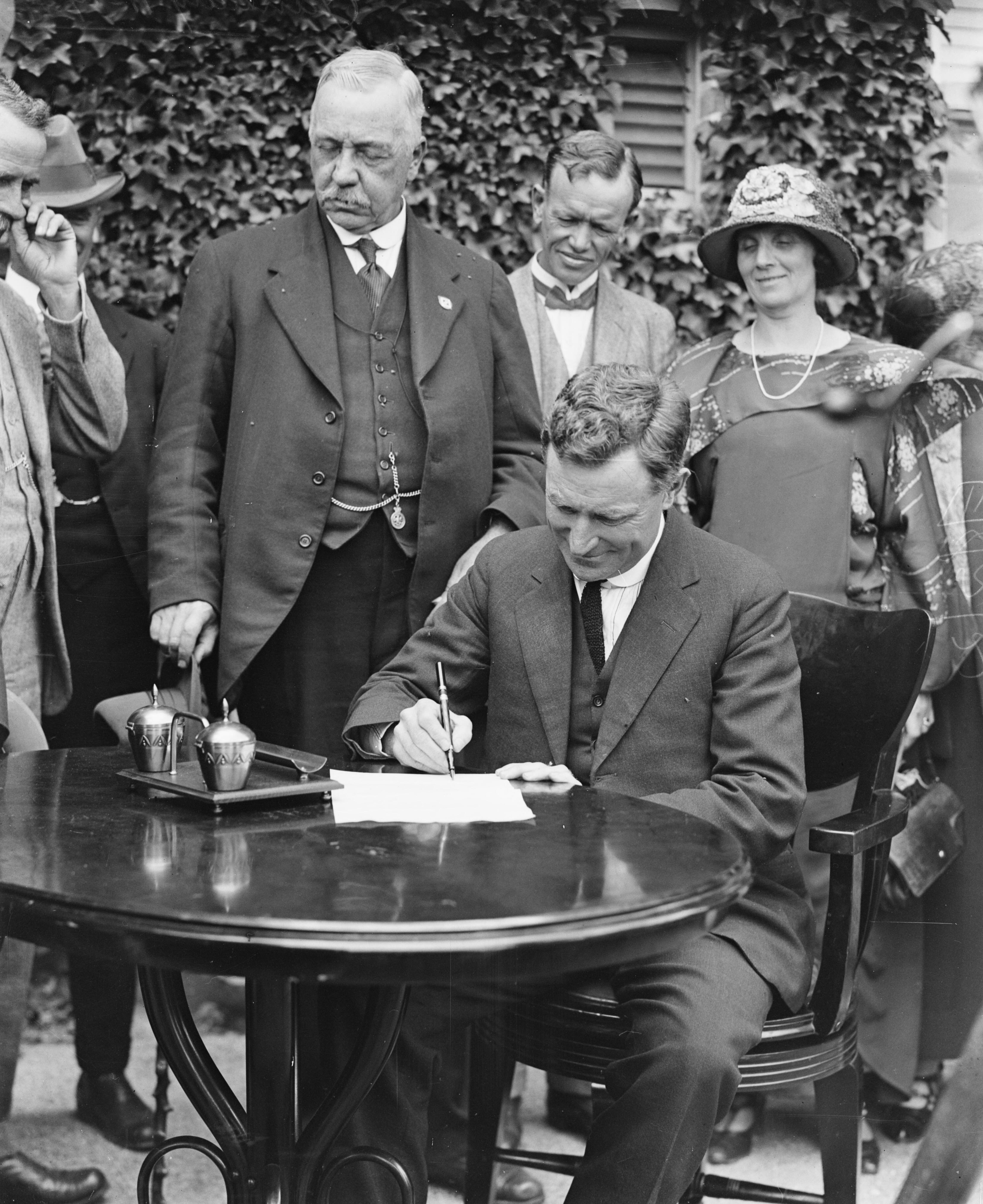
Page in 1924 as acting prime minister signing the first cabinet document prepared in Canberra

=== Government formation ===
Page was elected leader of the Country Party in 1921, replacing William McWilliams. At the 1922 federal election the party campaigned on a platform which included the establishment of a national sinking fund, national insurance scheme covering "sickness, unemployment, poverty and age", and conversion of the Commonwealth Bank into a full central bank. The party emerged from the election with the balance of power in the House; the Nationalist government of Billy Hughes lost its majority and could not govern without Country Party support. It soon became apparent that the price for that support would be a full coalition with the Nationalists. However, the Country Party had been formed partly due to discontent with Hughes' rural policy, and Page's animosity toward Hughes was such that he would not even consider supporting him. Indeed, he would not even begin talks with the Nationalists as long as Hughes remained leader. Bowing to the inevitable, Hughes resigned.

Page then began negotiations with Hughes' successor as leader of the Nationalists, Stanley Bruce. His terms were stiff; he wanted his Country Party to have five seats in an 11-man cabinet, including the post of Treasurer and the second rank in the ministry for himself. These demands were unprecedented for a prospective junior coalition partner in a Westminster system, and especially so for such a new party. Nonetheless, Bruce agreed rather than force another election. For all intents and purposes, Page was the first Deputy Prime Minister of Australia (a title that did not officially exist until 1968). Since then, the leader of the Country/National Party has been the second-ranking member in nearly every non-Labor government. Page was acting prime minister on several occasions, and in January 1924 chaired the first meeting of Federal Cabinet ever held in Canberra, at Yarralumla. Parliament did not move to Canberra until 1927.

=== Treasurer ===
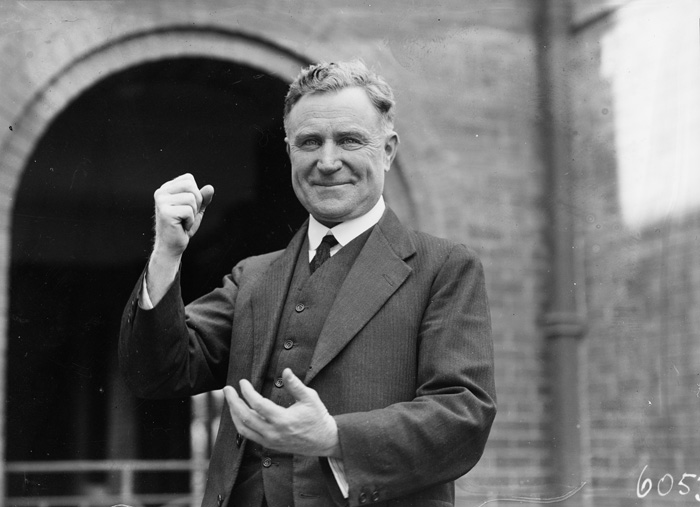
Page in 1929

As Treasurer, Page formed a close working relationship with Bruce. Due to favourable economic conditions the government was able to abolish land tax, cut income tax, and establishment the national sinking fund that Page had campaigned on. The government also established an investment fund for the Council for Scientific and Industrial Research and sponsored the first national housing program. The final years of Page's treasurership were marked by the beginnings of an economic downturn. The budget went into deficit in 1927 and his 1929 budget speech referred to a "temporary financial depression". He was a strong believer in orthodox finance and conservative policies, as well as a "high protectionist" supporting tariff barriers to protect Australian rural industries.

Page introduced a series of reforms to the Commonwealth Bank to enhance its central banking functions. In 1924, he announced that the government would place the Commonwealth Bank under an independent board, comprising a governor, the Treasury secretary, and representatives of industry. The same bill placed banknotes under the direct control of the bank, whereas previously it had been under a nominally independent Note Issue Board. Later reforms saw the establishment of a Rural Credits Department within the bank, the profits of which were partly hypothecated to agricultural research. In March 1925, cabinet decided to return Australia to the gold standard, which it had left during World War I. It delayed its announcement until the United Kingdom had decided it would do the same, which "disguised what was arguably Australia’s first explicit macroeconomic policy decision".

In 1924, Bruce and Page established the Loan Council to coordinate public-sector borrowings between the state and federal governments. It was given constitutional force with an amendment passed in 1928. The government abolished the previous system of per-capita grants to states that had been implemented in 1911 and began introducing tied grants, initially for road building. It also established a royal commission into the proposed National Insurance scheme, chaired by Senator John Millen. Page was one of the chief supporters of the National Insurance Bill 1928, which would have provided "sickness, old age, disability and maternity benefits", as well as payments to orphans and a limited form of child endowment. It was to be paid for by compulsory contributions from workers and co-contributions from employers. The government took the policy to the 1928 Australian federal election but failed to pass the bill by the time of its defeat in 1929.

As Treasurer, Page continued his professional medical practice. On 22 October 1924, he had to tell his best friend, Thomas Shorten Cole (1870–1957), the news that his wife Mary Ann Crane had just died on the operating table from complications of intestinal or stomach cancer, reputed by their daughter Dorothy May Cole to be "the worst day of his life". Due to a shortage of surgeons in Canberra, in 1928 Page performed an appendectomy on fellow MP Parker Moloney.

== Out of office, 1929–1934 ==
In his memoirs, Page recalled that the defeat of the government at the 1929 election came as a relief, following the intense stress of the government's final term. He and the Country Party sat on the crossbench, with John Latham replacing Bruce as Nationalist leader and leader of the opposition. Page regarded time out of office as a period which "sharpened our wits and enabled us to prepare public opinion for the policies we hoped to implement when the next opportunity came".

In 1931, a group of dissident Labor MPs led by former Scullin government minister Joseph Lyons merged with the Nationalists to form the United Australia Party (UAP), with Lyons replacing Latham as opposition leader. Page and Lyons produced a joint policy statement in October 1931 and Page expected that the Country Party would form a new coalition government. However, at the 1931 election the UAP won majority government in its own right. Lyons offered the Country Party three cabinet positions, on the basis that he would choose the ministers and portfolios. Page rejected this and also insisted that the trade and customs portfolio be assigned to the Country Party. Negotiations eventually collapsed and Lyons formed a UAP-only ministry.

Page's oldest son Earle Jr. was killed by a lightning strike in January 1933; shortly after his wife Ethel suffered a stroke. Page considered retiring from politics but was persuaded to instead take a leave of absence, with his deputy Thomas Paterson serving as acting leader of the Country Party for nine months.

== Lyons government, 1934–1939 ==
The UAP lost its majority at the 1934 election, after which Lyons governed in minority for two months. He eventually negotiated a new coalition agreement with Page, which provided four ministerial positions and assurances around tariff policies. Page was appointed Minister for Commerce, a significant portfolio covering agriculture and trade policy, and again became the de facto deputy prime minister.

One of Page's first initiatives in the commerce portfolio was the creation of the Australian Agricultural Council (AAC) in December 1934, which aimed to coordinate state and federal agricultural policy on a similar basis to the Loan Council. In his 1934 election policy he had envisioned the AAC as a "board of directors for Australian agriculture" that would "eliminate needless waste of public and private capital". The council "quickly became central to agricultural policy", covering a wide variety of topics including debt relief for farmers, agricultural marketing (reforms to which were rejected in a 1937 referendum), soil erosion, pest control, and problems in the wheat and dairy industries. Page found some of his attempts to guide policy were stymied by state agricultural ministers, with the AAC remaining a voluntary body reliant on passage of state legislation.

Page was made a Knight Grand Cross of the Order of St Michael and St George (GCMG) in the New Year's Day Honours of 1938. While nine Australian prime ministers were knighted (and Bruce was elevated to the peerage), Page is the only one who was knighted before becoming prime minister.

== Prime Minister and aftermath ==
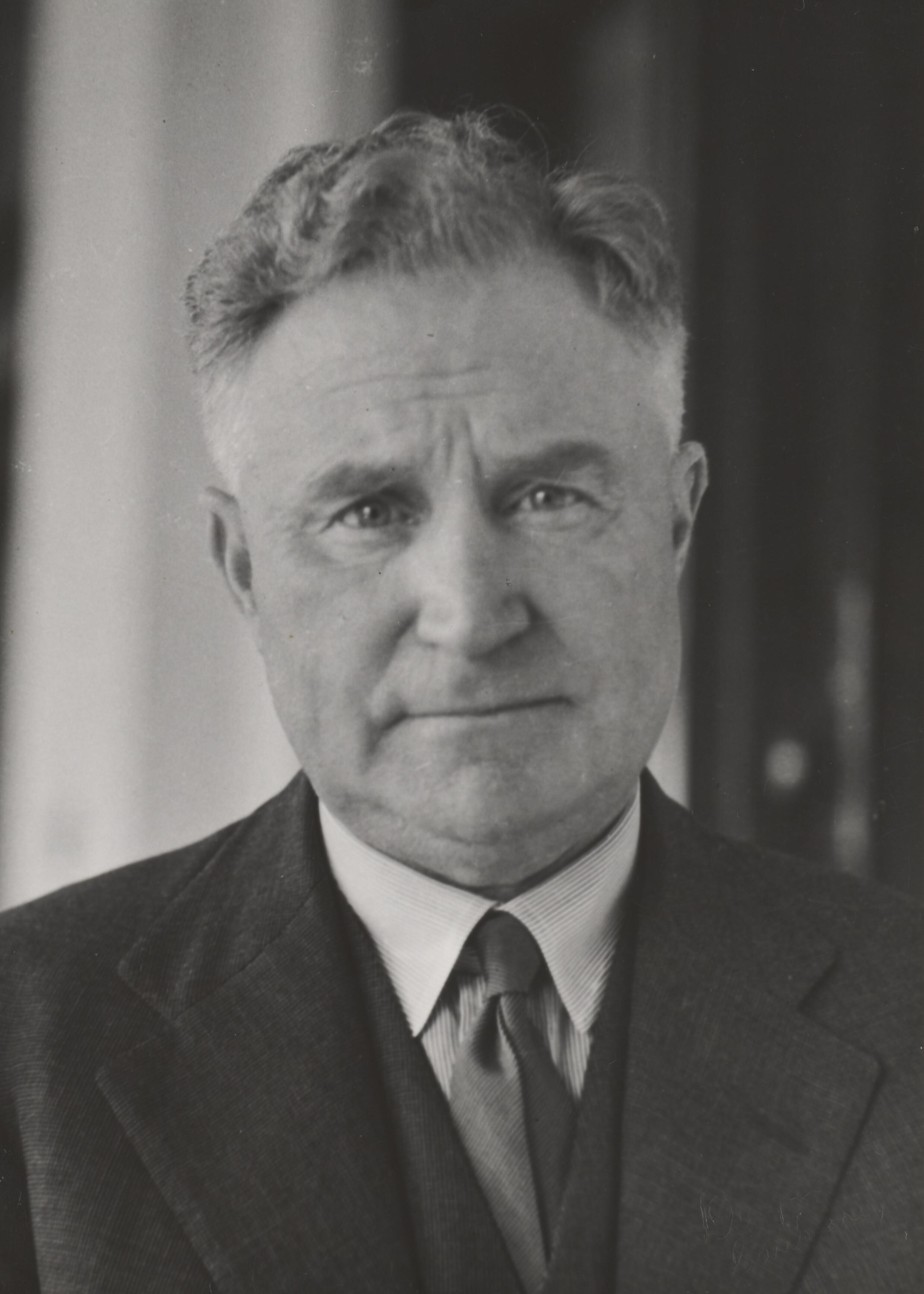
Page c. 1940

When Lyons died suddenly in 1939, the Governor-General of Australia Lord Gowrie appointed Page as caretaker prime minister pending the UAP choosing a new leader. He held the office for three weeks until the UAP elected former deputy leader Robert Menzies as its new leader, and hence prime minister. Page had been close to Lyons, but disliked Menzies, whom he charged publicly with having been disloyal to Lyons. Page contacted Stanley Bruce (now in London as Australian High Commissioner to the UK) and offered to resign his seat if Bruce would return to Australia to seek re-election to the parliament in a by-election for Page's old seat, and then seek election as UAP leader. Bruce said that he would only re-enter the parliament as an independent.

When Menzies was elected UAP leader, Page refused to serve under him, and made an extraordinary personal attack on him in the House, accusing him not only of ministerial incompetence but of physical cowardice (for failing to enlist during World War I). His party soon rebelled, though, and Page was deposed as Country Party leader in favour of Archie Cameron.

== World War II ==
In March 1940, Archie Cameron led the Country Party back into coalition with the UAP. However, he resigned as party leader on 16 October, following the 1940 federal election. Page attempted to regain the party's leadership, but was deadlocked with John McEwen over multiple ballots. As a compromise, the party elected Arthur Fadden as acting leader; he was confirmed in the position a few months later. Page replaced Cameron as Minister for Commerce in the reconstituted ministry.

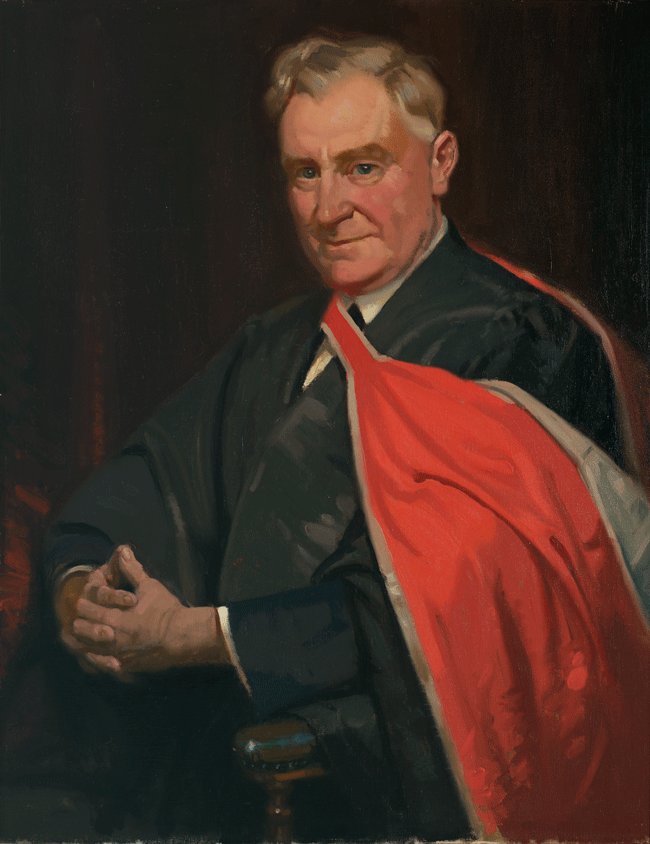
Parliament House portrait of Page by Fred Leist, 1940–41

Fadden replaced Menzies as prime minister in August 1941. A few weeks later, cabinet decided to send Page to London as resident minister, with the intention that he would be granted access to the British War Cabinet. While he was en route to England, the Fadden government lost a confidence motion and was replaced by an ALP minority government. The new prime minister John Curtin nonetheless allowed Page to take up the position, declining his offer to return to Australia. The attack on Pearl Harbor in December changed the dynamic of Anglo-Australian relations, as the War in the Pacific became the primary concern of the Australian government. Page assisted in the creation of the Pacific War Council early the following year. He later recalled Winston Churchill's frustration in war cabinet meetings with Curtin's decision to withdraw troops from the Middle East and North Africa and return them to Australia. He credited himself with helping negate the tensions between the two men, but in February 1942 mistakenly advised Churchill that the Australian government was amenable to diverting the 7th Division to Burma rather than return it directly to Australia. He was heavily rebuked by Curtin and external affairs minister Herbert Evatt for his error.

Page wrote to Curtin in April 1942 that since January he had been through "the worst period of acute mental distress of my whole life". His tenure was not regarded as a success, and he was said to have suffered from a lack of experience in diplomacy. Field Marshal Alan Brooke, the Chief of the Imperial General Staff, recalled that in war cabinet meetings he had "the mentality of a greengrocer". Page left London in June 1942 following a severe bout of pneumonia. He had been made a Member of the Order of the Companions of Honour (CH) before his departure. He returned to Australia in August, travelling via the United States, and quickly turned his attention to planning for post-war reconstruction.

Page spent the remaining years of the Curtin and Chifley governments on the opposition backbench. He served on the Advisory War Council and was a delegate to the constitutional convention in Canberra in late 1942, which included members of all major political parties. However, he was frustrated by the government's failure to offer him any formal role in developing post-war policy, which he believed was due to him given his past work. Page's brother Harold and nephew Robert were killed by the Japanese during the war.

== Return to the ministry ==
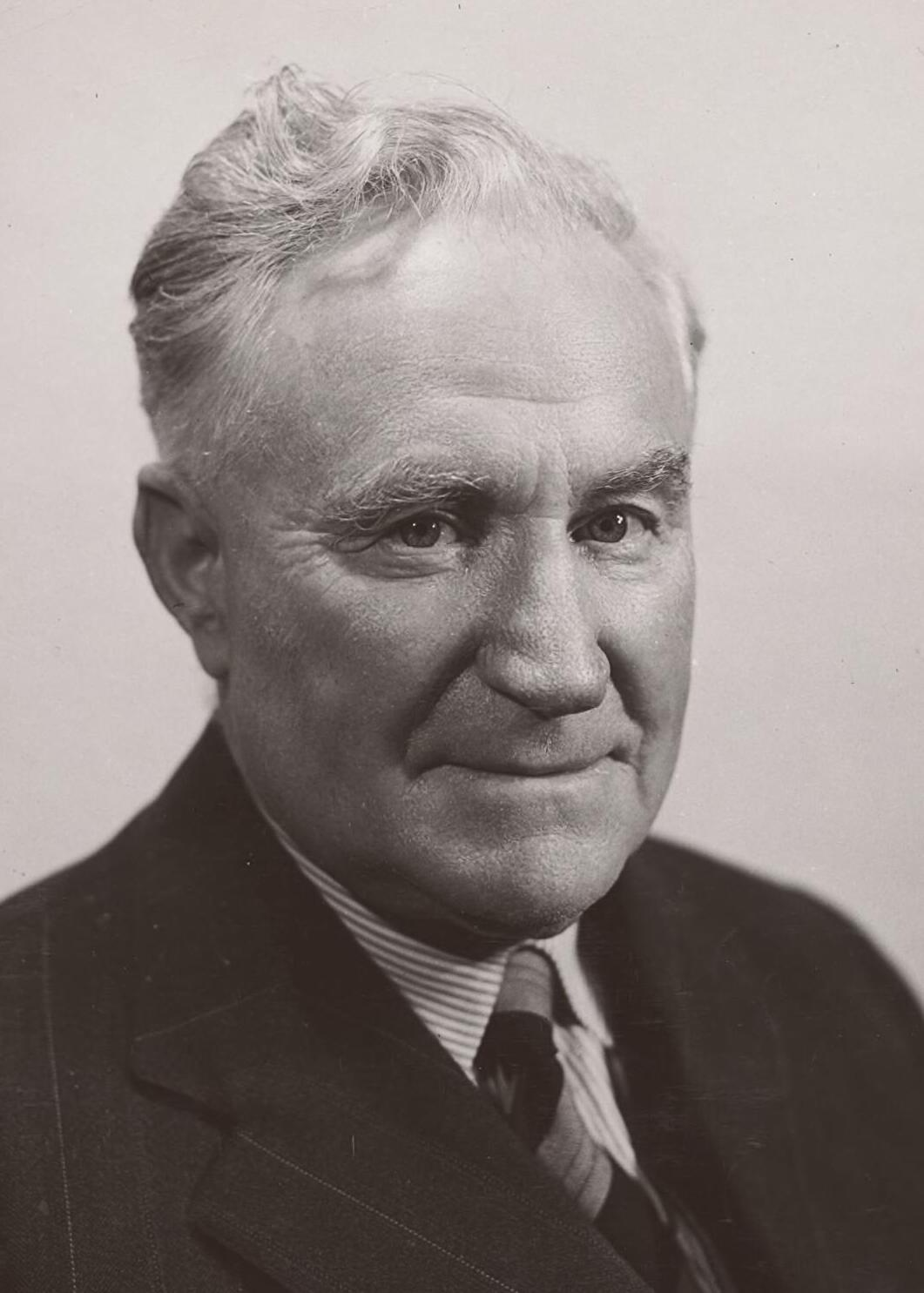
Page c. 1950

Page was reappointed Minister for Health after the Coalition won the 1949 federal election, at the age of 69. He was the chief architect of the National Health Act 1953, which established a national public health scheme based on government subsidies of voluntary private insurance and free medical services for pensioners. He played a key role in securing the support of the medical profession, which had strongly opposed the Chifley government's attempt to introduce universal health care. Unlike in previous governments, Page had little influence beyond his own policy area and was frustrated by the lack of interest in his ideas for national development. In 1951 when Senator Gordon Brown of the ALP suffered a stroke while speaking in the Senate, Page, a trained surgeon rushed in from the House to treat him before medical professionals could take Brown to hospital for treatment.

Upon the death of Billy Hughes in October 1952, Page became the Father of the House of Representatives and Father of the Parliament. In 1954, he became the first chancellor of the University of New England, which had become fully autonomous from the University of Sydney. He retired from cabinet at the age of 76, moving to the backbench in January 1956 after the December 1955 election.

Upon Arthur Fadden's retirement in 1958, Page became the only former prime minister returned at that year's election.

== Electoral history ==
Electoral results of Page's seat: Cowper
Electorate	Election	Votes				Vote change (Note: Based on first-preference vote only.)	Total time
Electorate	Election	First-preference (%)		Two-party preference (%)		Vote change	Total time
Cowper (New South Wales)	1919	11,372	52.4	15,543	71.6	—N/a	—N/a
Cowper (New South Wales)	1922	13,157	67.3	—N/a		▲14.1%	3 years, 3 days
Cowper (New South Wales)	1925	24,571	70.0	—N/a		▲5.1%	5 years, 336 days
Cowper (New South Wales)	1928	27,556	76.8	—N/a		▲4.4%	8 years, 340 days
Cowper (New South Wales)	1929	unopposed					9 years, 303 days
Cowper (New South Wales)	1931	29,266	72.3	30,476	75.3	▼2.6% (Note: From the 1928 result.)	12 years, 6 days
Cowper (New South Wales)	1934	30,924	64.2	33,935	70.4	▼8.0%	14 years, 276 days
Cowper (New South Wales)	1937	32,000	63.2	—N/a		▼0.5%	17 years, 314 days
Cowper (New South Wales)	1940	27,773	53.7	33,590	64.9	▼9.3%	20 years, 283 days
Cowper (New South Wales)	1943	24,017	45.5	27,737	52.7	▼7.7%	23 years, 251 days
Cowper (New South Wales)	1946	31,785	57.2	33,071	59.5	▲11.4%	26 years, 289 days
Cowper (New South Wales)	1949	22,791	61.7	—N/a		▲4.6%	29 years, 362 days
Cowper (New South Wales)	1951	22,632	61.0	23,001	62.0	▼0.7%	31 years, 136 days
Cowper (New South Wales)	1954	21,767	58.8	21,805	58.9	▼2.0%	34 years, 167 days
Cowper (New South Wales)	1955	unopposed					35 years, 362 days
Cowper (New South Wales)	1958	21,152	54.8	23,566	61.1	▼4.5% (Note: From the 1954 result.)	38 years, 344 days
Cowper (New South Wales)	1961	15,259	39.9	18,442	48.2	▼14.6%	41 years, 361 days

== Later life and death ==
Page sought a 17th term in parliament at the 1961 election, having joined Billy Hughes two years earlier as only the second person to serve over 40 years in federal parliament. Two weeks before the election, he experienced stomach pains while visiting the home of Ian Robinson near Coraki. His health then dramatically declined and he was admitted to the Royal Prince Alfred Hospital in Sydney. He was diagnosed with bowel cancer and underwent immediate surgery. He had been gravely ill even before being admitted to hospital and was too sick to campaign nearly as actively as he had campaigned in the previous four decades. He fought the election anyway, though he scarcely appeared on the hustings.

Page died in hospital on 20 December 1961, aged 81. He was granted a state funeral at St Andrew's Cathedral, Sydney. At his request, his ashes were scattered over the Clarence River near his home. On the same date Page died, the election result in Cowper was declared and recorded his defeat by Labor challenger Frank McGuren, as part of a nationwide swing against the Coalition. The seat had been reported as a Labor gain on election night 11 days earlier; Page died without knowing he had been defeated.

Page had represented Cowper for just four days short of 42 years, making him the longest-serving Australian federal parliamentarian who represented the same seat throughout his career. Only Billy Hughes and Philip Ruddock have served in Parliament longer than Page. He was the last former prime minister to lose his seat until Tony Abbott lost his seat of Warringah in 2019, though John Howard would lose his seat of Bennelong as a sitting prime minister in 2007.

Page's defeat/death saw the Australian Federal Parliament having no former prime ministers among its members for the first time since the period between Sir Joseph Cook's resignation from Parliament in 1921 to become Australian High Commissioner to the United Kingdom and Page forcing Billy Hughes' resignation as prime minister in 1923.

== Personal life ==
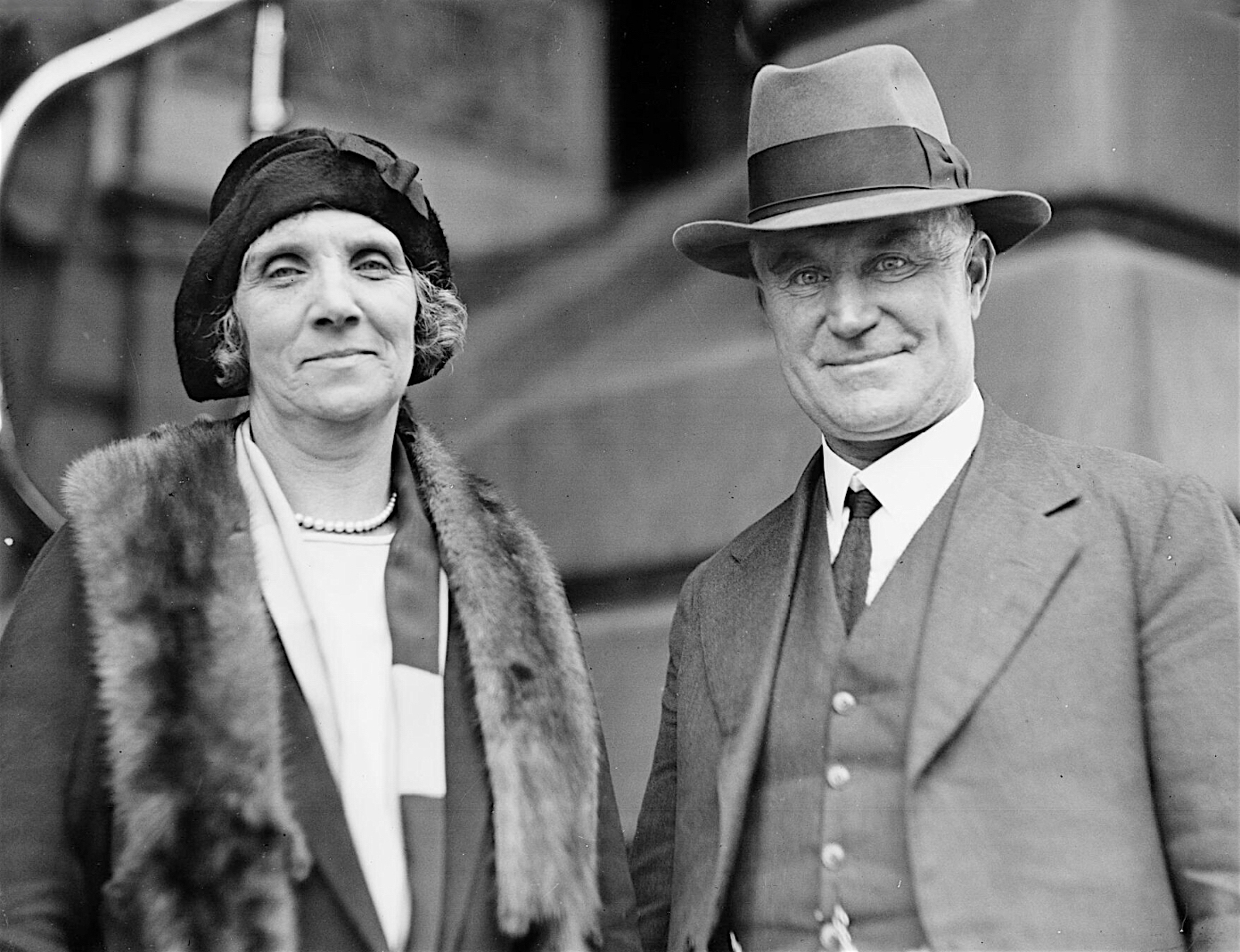
Page and his first wife Ethel

Page married Ethel Blunt on 18 September 1906. They had met at Royal Prince Alfred Hospital while he was undertaking his medical residency; she was a senior nurse there. Page soon began courting her, and convinced her to become the matron of his new hospital in Grafton. She gave up nursing after their marriage, but was active in politics and community organisations. The couple had five children: Mary (b. 1909), Earle Jr. (b. 1910), Donald (b. 1912), Iven (b. 1914), and Douglas (b. 1916). Their grandchildren include Don Page, who was active in New South Wales state politics including a stint as Deputy Leader of the New South Wales Nationals, and Geoff Page, a poet.

Page was predeceased by his first wife and his oldest son. Earle Jr., a qualified veterinarian, was killed by a lightning strike in January 1933, aged 22. Ethel died in May 1958, aged 82, after a long illness. On 20 July 1959 at St Paul's Cathedral, London, Page married for a second time, wedding his long-serving secretary Jean Thomas (32 years his junior). Stanley Bruce was his best man. The second Lady Page lived for almost 50 years after her husband's death, dying on 20 June 2011; her ashes were interred at Northern Suburbs Crematorium.

== Honours ==
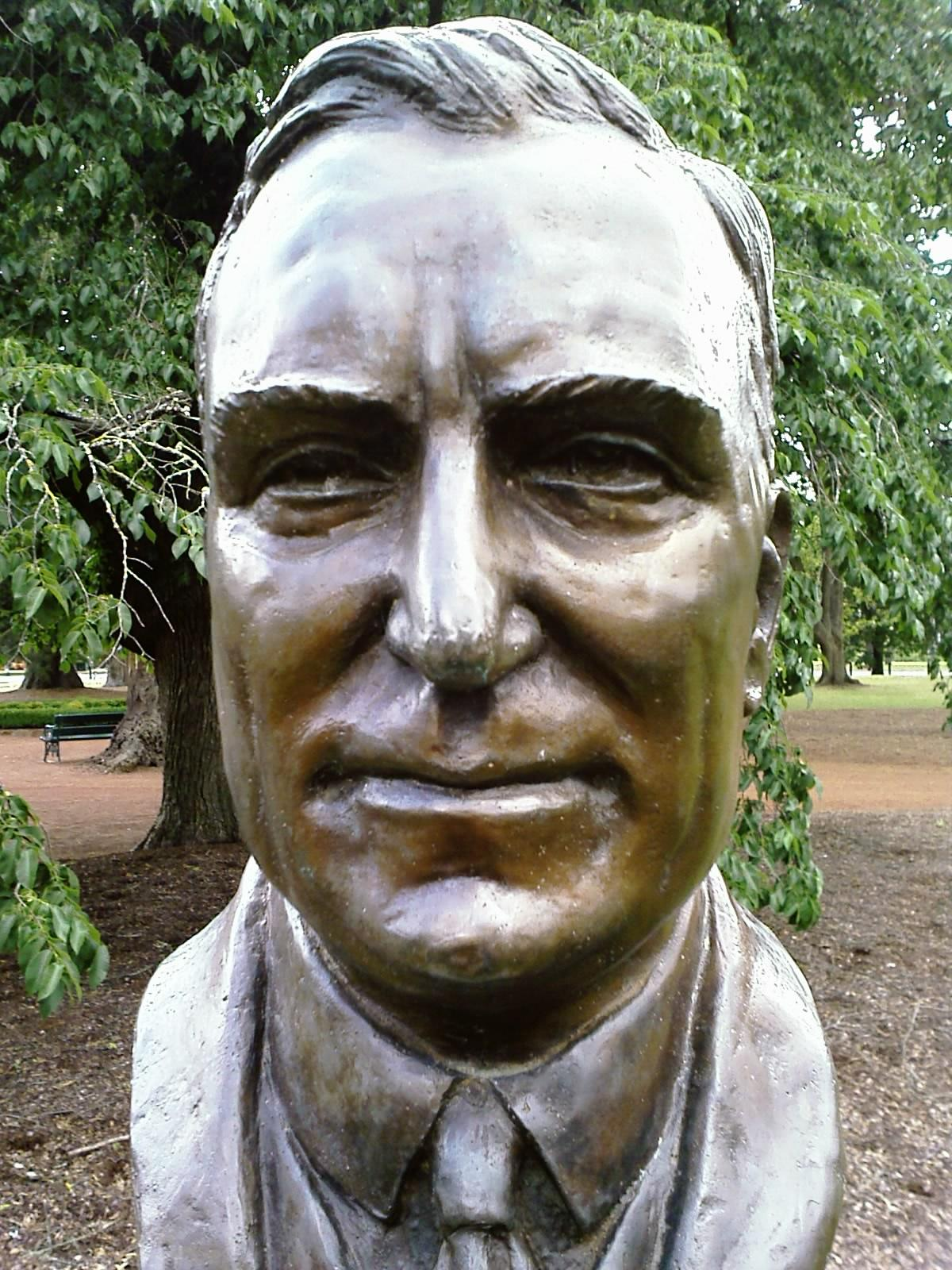
Bust of Earle Page, Prime Ministers Avenue in the Ballarat Botanical Gardens

Decorations

- In 1929, Page was made a member of the Privy Council of the United Kingdom (PC).
- In 1938, Page was made a Knight Grand Cross of the Order of St Michael and St George (GCMG).
- In 1942, Page was made a member of the Order of the Companions of Honour (CH).
- In 1942, Page was made an honorary Fellow of the Royal College of Surgeons of England (FRCS).
- In 1952, Page was awarded the degree of Doctor of Science honoris causa by the University of Sydney.
- In 1955, Page was awarded the degree of Doctor of Science honoris causa by the University of New England (the first honorary degree awarded by the institution).

Namesakes

- Division of Page – division of the federal House of Representatives; established in 1984, includes the city of Grafton
- Page, Australian Capital Territory – suburb of Canberra
- The Sir Earle Page Library and Education Centre, in the city of Grafton
- Earle Page College – residential college of the University of New England; opened in 1963
- Page Chest Pavilion – building at Royal Prince Alfred Hospital; opened in 1957, demolished in 2010
- Page Research Centre – think tank associated with the National Party of Australia; established in 2003

== See also ==
- Political families of Australia

Parliament of Australia
Preceded by John Thomson	Member for Cowper; 1919–1961	Succeeded by Frank McGuren
Preceded by Billy Hughes	Father of the House of Representatives; 1952–1961	Succeeded by Eddie Ward
Preceded by Billy Hughes	Father of the Parliament; 1952–1961	Succeeded by Eddie Ward
Party political offices
New political party	Leader of the Country Party; 1922–1939	Succeeded by Archie Cameron
New title	Federal President of the Country Party; 1926–1961	Succeeded by William Moss
Political offices
Preceded by Joseph Lyons	Prime Minister of Australia; 1939	Succeeded by Robert Menzies
Preceded by Stanley Bruce	Treasurer of Australia; 1923–1929	Succeeded by E G Theodore
Preceded by Frederick Stewart	Minister for Commerce; 1934–1939	Succeeded by George McLeay
Preceded by Billy Hughes	Minister for Health; 1937–1938	Succeeded by Harry Foll
Preceded by Archie Cameron	Minister for Commerce; 1940–1941	Succeeded by William Scully
Preceded by Nick McKenna	Minister for Health; 1949–1956	Succeeded by Donald Cameron
Academic offices
New title	Chancellor of the University of New England; 1954–1960	Succeeded by Phillip Wright
