= 2/10th Commando Squadron (Australia) =

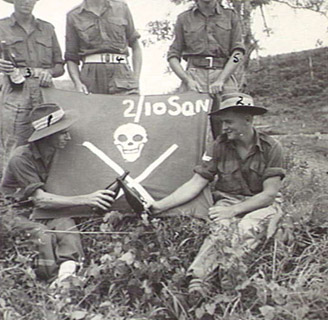
- Members of the 2/10th Commando Squadron in New Guinea September 1945
- Active: 1944–1946
- Country: Australia
- Branch: Australian Army
- Type: Reconnaissance unit
- Role: Reconnaissance and long range patrols
- Size: 17 officers and 243 other ranks
- Part of: 2/6th Cavalry Commando Regiment, attached to 6th Division
- Engagements: World War II: Aitape–Wewak campaign

Commanders
- Notable commanders: Major Allan Goode

Insignia
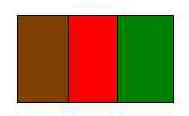
- Unit colour patch

The 2/10th Commando Squadron was a commando unit raised by the Australian Army for service in World War II. Raised in 1944, the unit saw action late in the war against the Japanese during the Aitape–Wewak campaign. During this campaign the squadron carried out a number of tasks including long-range patrols, flank protection and area defence. Later in the campaign the 2/10th were used to spearhead an amphibious assault landing at Dove Bay, east of Wewak before being used as line infantry during the final 'mopping up' stages of the campaign. Following the end of the war the unit was disbanded.

== History ==
=== Formation ===
At the beginning of World War II, the Australian Army formed a number of independent companies which later became commando squadrons. Initially these units were formed with the intention of sending them to the Middle East to fight, however, following Japan's entry into the war and the subsequent shift in Australia's strategic focus, these units were employed in a variety of roles in the early stages of the fighting in the Pacific, serving with considerable distinction. In 1943–44, as part of a re-organisation of the Australian Army to prepare it for jungle warfare, these independent commando squadrons were re-organised into a regimental system underneath the headquarters of the divisional cavalry units of the 6th, 7th and 9th Divisions. As a part of this re-organisation, the 2/10th Commando Squadron was raised in January 1944, as part of the 2/6th Cavalry Commando Regiment, attached to the 6th Division.

Following the unit's formation, the squadron began training on the Atherton Tablelands in Queensland before embarking for New Guinea in late 1944.

=== Aitape–Wewak campaign ===
In October 1944 the squadron was one of the first Australian combat units to relieve the American forces at Aitape. Throughout November the 2/10th undertook patrol operations in the Suain–Luain area, carrying out reconnaissance in search of Japanese forces between the Dandriwad and Danmap Rivers. Later, in December, the squadron was attached to the 17th Brigade and took up defensive positions around Vokau.

They remained in this role until February 1945 when the squadron returned to conducting offensive operations, relieving the 2/7th Commando Squadron at Walum and Nilu. The 2/6th Cavalry Commando Regiment had been given the task of clearing the Maprik area and in order to carry out these orders, the 2/10th crossed the Torricelli Range and established a base in the foothills at Ami. From there, the squadron continued to move in a southerly direction towards Maprik, protecting the flanks of the 2/5th and 2/7th Infantry Battalions that were operating further inland.

As well as keeping the enemy from the flanks of the two infantry battalions, the 2/10th was tasked to clear the populous areas to the north-east of the Ami villages. Initially the Australians were very successful, managing to use surprise to their advantage in dealing with the pockets of Japanese resistance that they encountered, however, as the fighting continued they began to suffer for lack of fire support. In an effort to overcome this problem air support from Aitape was called in, and each of the squadron's three troops were given a 2-inch mortar, while a 3-inch mortar section was attached to the squadron. Throughout February a number of ambushes and attacks were undertaken by the squadron, before on 20 February 1945, 'C' Troop carried out an attack on Kualigem which failed to remove the Japanese from the village and resulted in the loss of two officers killed and five troopers wounded.

In March 1945 the squadron carried out further patrols, this time in the Milak, Maurak and Aupik areas. The Japanese presence in this area was considerable and they became more aggressive, carrying out regular patrols, setting ambushes and re-occupying the villages that the Australians had taken the previous month.

On 13 March, as the Japanese began to gain the initiative in the area, they began to concentrate their efforts on one of the 2/10th's troops, based at Milak and about two days away from the nearest support. Early in the evening the Japanese launched the first attack, and although this was beaten off they continued to maintain harassing fire throughout the night and into the following day. The following night, 14/15 March, having completely surrounded the troop, the Japanese attacked again but were again repulsed. By 15 March, supplies of food and ammunition were short and an aerial resupply was used to relieve the situation, although the supplies fell outside of the Australian position and patrols had to be sent out to retrieve them; in the end of the eight cylinders the Australians got five and the Japanese retrieved three. Later in the day, as the Japanese took up positions less than 50 yards (46 m) from the Australian perimeter, air attacks were called in, before the Japanese launched fresh attacks that night. The situation began to get desperate before finally, on 19 March, after a five-day siege the lines of communication were re-established and the enemy pressure eased. At the end of the fighting, it was estimated that 45 Japanese had been killed.

The troop at Maurak had also come under attack at this time, while the troop patrolling Aupik also had a number of clashes. By the end of March, however, it became clear that the squadron was in need of relief. They had suffered three killed and eight wounded, and had counted at least 91 enemy dead during the contacts they had undertaken that month. Finally they were withdrawn back Vokau, for a period of rest and re-organisation.

This would not last for very long, however. On 11 May 1945, the 2/6th Cavalry Commando Regiment, as part of Farida Force took part in an amphibious landing at Dove Bay, eas of Wewak. Along with the 2/9th Commando Squadron, the 2/10th formed the initial assault force. Coming ashore ahead of the main landing force, the assault squadrons came up against only very sporadic Japanese resistance and as the rest of the force moved inland, the 2/10th secured the beachhead. Later they were moved to the west to Mandi, where the squadron headquarters set up in the Mandi garden and they began patrolling operations along the Wewak-Forok road.

In the first half of June, the squadron moved into a position about 2 miles (3.2 km) west of the Brandi Plantation and here they came into close contact with a force of Japanese that had been forced out from Wewak and were attempting to raid Australian positions in the hope of gathering supplies. Casualties and losses from illness had been heavy and the squadron had been reduced to roughly half its effective strength, regardless the squadron maintained the pressure on the Japanese in the hills to the south through a program of aggressive patrolling. On 5 June 1945, a full squadron attack was launched upon a complex of Japanese bunkers that was discovered about 1,000 yards (910 m) south of the Australian perimeter. Only 70 men could be mustered for the attack and when they encountered heavy machine gun fire from the bunkers, they were forced to withdraw and call for fire support from the artillery of the 2/2nd Field Regiment at Boram. In less than 10 minutes, over 800 shells were fired by the 16 guns of the 2/2nd Field Regiment and the result was devastating, as 17 of the 25 Japanese bunkers were totally destroyed. Japanese casualties were estimated at being at least 32 dead.

On 14 June the squadron was relieved by a company from the 2/3rd Machine Gun Battalion, however, in the third week of June they were back in action as the regiment was given the task of dealing with the a daring infiltration of Japanese forces to the west of Boiken. On 24 June five Japanese raided the ANGAU camp at Wisling, capturing a number of weapons. The following day, a party of about 10 Japanese ambushed a patrol from the 2/10th south of the plantation, killing one officer and wounding four troopers. These raids continued throughout the rest of June and into July before the 2/10th were relieved by the 2/7th Commando Squadron on 5 July and they moved to Cape Karawop, where the regimental headquarters had been situated.

The 2/10th remained at Karawop until the end of the war, however, they continued to see action right up until the Japanese surrendered. On 23 July 1945, a patrol from the 2/10th clashed with a force of about 40 Japanese in the hills south of Wanpea; eight Japanese were killed, while the Australians lost four men, including one officer.

=== Disbandment ===
Following the end of hostilities, the squadron remained at Karawop, having to wait until November 1945 before they were moved back to Wewak. Slowly the squadron's strength was reduced as individuals who had enough points to do so were returned to Australia for demobilisation, while others were transferred to other units for occupation duties. Finally, however, in late 1945 the remaining members of the 2/10th were returned to Australia and the unit was finally disbanded.

During the course of its service during the war the 2/10th lost 23 men killed in action or died on active service, and 45 men wounded. Members of the squadron received the following decorations: one Military Cross, two Military Medals, and three Mentions in Despatches.

== Commanding officers ==
The 2/10th Commando Squadron's commanding officer was:

- Major Allan Lancelot Goode.

== See also ==
- South West Pacific theatre of World War II
- Pacific War
