= Farida Force =

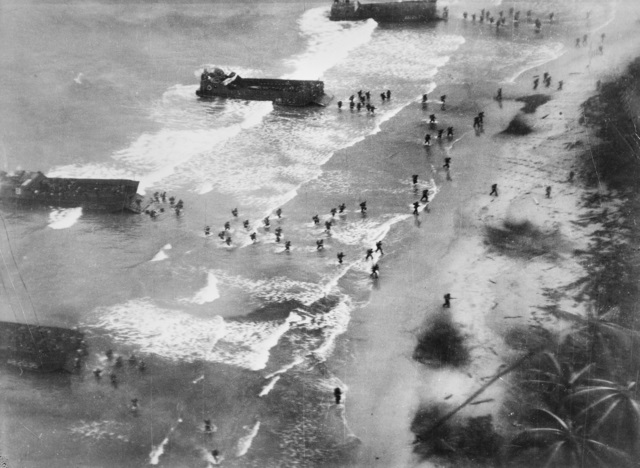
- Farida Force landing at Dove Bay
- Active: 1945
- Country: Australia
- Branch: Australian Army
- Type: Ad hoc composite force
- Size: 623 men
- Part of: Attached to Australian 6th Division
- Engagements: Aitape-Wewak campaign

Commanders
- Commander: Eric Claude Hennessy

Farida Force was the name given to an ad hoc composite Australian Army unit formed during World War II. Largely consisting of Australian commandos, the force was established for the purpose for conducting an amphibious landing at Dove Bay, east of Wewak during the Aitape-Wewak campaign. Coming ashore in mid-May 1945, the force quickly established a beachhead and pushed inland, cutting the Wewak road. Afterwards, the commandos conducted patrolling operations before Farida Force was dissolved and its constituent units placed under the command of the 19th Brigade for further operations around Wewak.

== Composition ==
The force consisted of 623 men under the command of Lieutenant Colonel Eric Hennessy, commanding officer of the 2/6th Cavalry (Commando) Regiment. On 11 May 1945, the force conducted an amphibious landing at Dove Bay, east of Wewak during the Aitape-Wewak campaign. It was made up of troops drawn from the 2/9th and 2/10th Commando Squadrons, two 75 mm mountain guns of the 1st Anti-Tank Battery (detached from the 2/1st Anti-Tank Regiment), one company from the 2/3rd Machine Gun Battalion serving as infantry as well as a platoon of machine-gunners from that unit, two detachments of mortars and other support elements.

== History ==
The force was transported to the form up point 10,000 yards (9,100 m) off the landing beach in three vessels, the Swan, Dubbo and Colac, and from there they transferred to assault craft. The first wave went in to the beach at 08:34, landing slightly to the west of their assigned beach, and experienced no effective opposition. Minutes later the second wave arrived, carrying the rest of the commando assault force. Advancing inland to establish a beach-head, the squadrons encountered very little resistance, although there were signs of recent enemy departure. By 10:24 the beach-head was established and stores began flowing from the transports off shore.

Over the course of the next week and a half, the elements of Farida Force began patrol operations around the surrounding area and cut the Wewak road, before being placed under the command of the 19th Brigade under Brigadier James Martin on 20 May 1945.

== See also ==
- Pacific War
