= 2/7th Commando Squadron (Australia) =

- Active: 1942–1946
- Country: Australia
- Branch: Australian Army
- Type: Commando
- Role: Reconnaissance and long range patrols
- Size: 17 officers and 256 men organised into a company HQ, plus three infantry troops, with attached signals, medical and engineering sections
- Part of: 2/6th Cavalry (Commando) Regiment (HQ), attached to Australian 6th Division
- Double diamonds: Brown
- Engagements: Second World War: Salamaua–Lae campaign; Aitape–Wewak campaign

Insignia
- Unit colour patch

The 2/7th Commando Company was one of 12 independent companies or commando squadrons raised by the Australian Army during the Second World War. Raised in May 1942, as the 2/7th Independent Company, the 2/7th served in New Guinea in 1943 during the Salamaua–Lae campaign before being redesignated as the 2/7th Commando Squadron when it was combine with two other commando squadrons to become part of the 2/6th Cavalry (Commando) Regiment. Later at the end of 1944, it was sent to New Guinea again, where it took part in the Aitape–Wewak campaign. Following the end of the war, the squadron was returned to Australia and disbanded early in 1946.

== History ==
=== Formation ===
In late 1940 the Australian Army began considering the issue of raising independent companies or commando units for the conduct of irregular warfare. Based upon proposals and advice from the British Military Mission in Australia, in March 1941 the Army began training company-sized units that would act independently of higher command to carry out tasks such as raiding, sabotage, and subversion. As the war progressed the role that these independent companies would fulfill evolved towards guerrilla operations such as stay-behind, long range penetration and reconnaissance. In this regard between 1941 and 1942 eight independent companies were raised. The 2/7th Independent Company was one of these units, and was formed in May 1942, undertaking training at the Guerrilla Warfare School at Wilsons Promontory, Victoria.

=== New Guinea 1942–1943 ===
Following the completion of its training, the company was deployed to New Guinea in late 1942, landing at Port Moresby. From there it was flown to Wau in January 1943, where it was used to reinforce elements of the 6th Division and units Kanga Force during the Salamaua–Lae campaign. Between January and April, the company operated in conjunction with 2/3rd and 2/5th Independent Companies, performing mainly a traditional infantry role. During this time they conducted a number of patrols and were involved in a very successful ambush on a large force of Japanese, resulting in a high number of enemy casualties. Later, they were directly involved with the defence of Wau, before helping to push the Japanese back to Mubo, where they conducted small scale harassment raids. The 2/7th's commanding officer, Major Thomas MacAdie, was awarded a Distinguished Service Order for his gallantry and leadership during this phase of the campaign.

In April, they were relieved by the 2/7th Battalion. They had served in the Wau area for seven months and were in need of rest, however, as there were no other troops available, on 29 May 1943 the 2/7th Independent Company was flown to Bena Bena where they became part of Bena Force. Bena Force had originally been dispatched to the isolated airfield in January consisting of only a handful of men from the 2/7th Battalion, with the task of defending it against the advancing Japanese, harassing the enemy in the area and denying them freedom of movement, however, in May as Japanese air attacks on Bena increased it became necessary to reinforce the small garrison. As such the depleted 2/7th Independent Company was sent to Bena, under the command of Major MacAdie, bringing the garrison up to roughly four hundred men. During June and July, observation posts were established in the region, patrols were sent out and infrastructure was built with the help of labour supplied by the Australian New Guinea Administrative Unit (ANGAU). Later, during August and September, as attacks increased on the garrison and the 2/2nd Independent Company arrived to reinforce Bena Force, patrols were sent out through the Ramu Valley in order to observe the main approaches to Bena Bena.

In October, following a re-organisation of Australian forces in New Guinea in preparation for the coming offensive around Lae, the 2/7th was temporarily placed under the command of the 7th Division. Following this, the company began patrolling operations along the Faria, Iogi and Evapia rivers, until they were finally relieved by the 2/6th Cavalry (Commando) Squadron in the second week of November. The 2/7th then returned to Dumpu, before embarking at Port Moresby for the return to Australia, having been deployed on active service for the best part of a year.

=== Reorganisation 1943–1945 ===
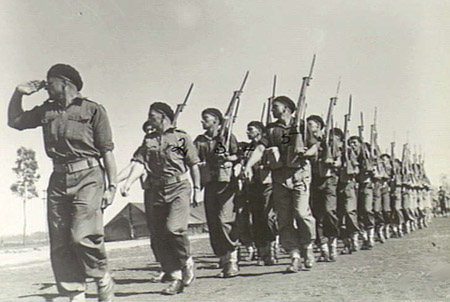
Parade Atherton Tableland, Queensland. 1944-09-11. B Troop, 2/6th Cavalry Commando Regt, salute during a march.

While the 2/7th Independent Company had been involved in the campaign in New Guinea, there had been a significant re-organisation of the way in which the Independent Companies were administered and organised. This was due to an army-wide reorganisation as the Australian Army shifted its strategic focus away from the Middle East and began to concentrate on the Pacific. As a result of this reorganisation, the 2/7th Independent Company was renamed the 2/7th Cavalry Commando Squadron (later just commando squadron) and was absorbed into the 2/6th Cavalry (Commando) Regiment, along with the newly formed 2/9th and 2/10th Commando Squadrons. Together, these units were attached to the 6th Division, to conduct long range patrol and reconnaissance operations.

Following their return from New Guinea, the newly formed 2/7th Commando Squadron concentrated on the Atherton Tablelands, Queensland, with the rest of the 2/6th Cavalry (Commando) Regiment. Throughout the rest of 1943 and most of 1944, the 2/7th carried out garrison duties and participated in exercises and training with the rest of the 6th Division. The squadron's last contribution to the Second World War came during the Aitape–Wewak campaign.

=== Aitape–Wewak 1945 ===
Early in 1945, the 6th Division relieved the American garrison at Aitape, with a view to renewing offensive operations in the area. The 2/6th Cavalry Commando Regiment was the first Australian fighting unit to arrive at Aitape, and as it waited for the rest of the division to arrive, having left Brisbane on 22 October 1944, the regiment relieved the American outpost at Babiang and began to assist the ANGAU patrols in the area. Once they had concentrated fully by November, the 6th Division began its advance eastwards towards the Japanese base at Wewak, in order to destroy the remnants of the Japanese 18th Army. Prior to this, however, the 2/7th Commando Squadron conducted preliminary patrols in order to gather information on topography and enemy dispositions in the region.

The Australian advance began in December and by this time, the 2/7th had been moved to Tong, where it had been given the tasks of maintaining a base, control the surrounding area and conduct patrols to the south. Now under the command of Major Goode, (Note: Long lists Goode's rank as major, but in the Australian War Memorial source it is stated that he was only a captain.) the squadron operated in support of the 17th Brigade, and had men stationed at Yourang and Kumbun. During this time there were a number of clashes with the enemy, most notably on 11th and 13 December, as the squadron established its control over the area, resulting in a number of Japanese killed in action. Once it had been relieved by 17th Brigade, the squadron conducted a number of reconnaissance patrols south of the Torriccelli Ranges, around the Dandriwad and Danmap Rivers, and then later once it had moved to the Yasuar Mission, patrolling along the Muam River. Throughout February the 2/7th began to push into enemy territory, moving along the Atop River and establishing bases at Kaumala, and at House Copper.

Finally, at the end of March, the 2/7th was relieved and returned to Aitape. The following month, the 2/7th was transported by landing craft to But, where they were to act as reserve for the 16th Brigade's advance to the Hawain River. While here, they were based at Banak and conducted a number of patrols in the surrounding area. As the campaign progressed into May, the 2/7th was transferred to the command of the 19th Brigade, which at the time was advancing on Wewak, with its limit of exploitation being the Brandi River. As it became clear that the Japanese were attempting to abandon their positions, the 2/7th were ordered to advance in a wide circle and capture the Sauri villages, where it was believed that the Japanese had established a strong rearguard to act as a blocking force.

The 2/7th advanced up the Waringe River with a strength of 156 men, supported by mortar and artillery, and over the course of two days proceeded to clear the enemy from the high ground along which they would launch their assault on the villages. On 11 May, two troops (Note: A military organisational term, roughly equivalent to an infantry platoon in size. Used for cavalry, engineers, armour instead of platoon.) from the 2/7th launched their assault, advancing along a spur that led to Walanter where they encountered a well-established enemy position. This position was assaulted and the objective taken over the course of two and a half hours, with the assistance of close support from artillery and flamethrowers to overcome the enemy resistance.

The 2/7th were then relieved by elements of the 2/8th Battalion at Sauri, before receiving orders to concentrate with the rest of the 2/6th Commando Regiment in the area around Brandi Plantation. By the start of June they began "mopping up" operations, firstly at Dove Bay and then at Karawop, before they were sent to Boiken in July, where they relieved the 2/10th Commando Squadron, which had been patrolling the area around the Dagua and Hawain Rivers in an attempt to deal with the Japanese raiding parties that were still operating in the area.

The 2/7th were still in Boiken when Japan surrendered on 15 August 1945. They were disbanded approximately six months later, early in 1946, after the last members were returned to Australia and demobilised. During the course of its service, the squadron lost 30 men killed in action or died on active service.

== Commanding officers ==
- Major Thomas Fergus Buchanan MacAdie, DSO; (Note: In addition to his Distinguished Service Order, MacAide was Mentioned in Despatches and later achieved the rank of lieutenant colonel. After the war, he was also later appointed an Officer of the Order of the British Empire for service rendered to the British Empire.)
- Captain Allan Lancelot Goode.

== Notes ==
Footnotes

Citations
