= Kizzire =

Kizzire is a surname. Notable people with the surname include:

- Lee Kizzire (1915–1943), American football player
- Patton Kizzire (born 1986), American golfer
