= Bena Force =

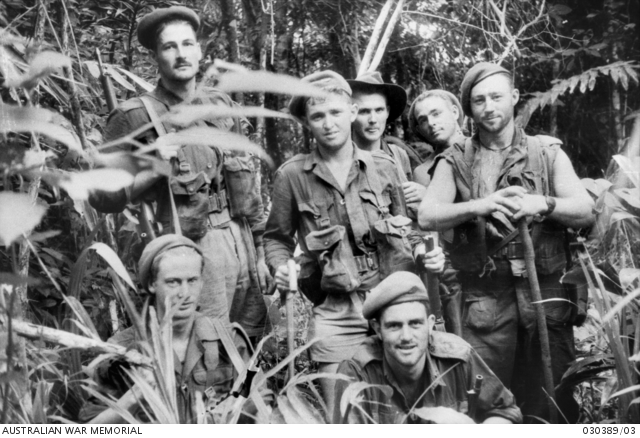
- Commandos from the 2/2nd Independent Company at Bena Bena, July 1943
- Active: 1943
- Country: Australia
- Branch: Australian Army
- Role: Defence, reconnaissance and long range patrols
- Part of: Kanga Force
- Garrison/HQ: Bena Bena, New Guinea

Bena Force was an ad hoc Australian Army formation that existed during World War II. Established in early 1943 to defend the Bena Bena–Mount Hagen plateau south of the Ramu River in New Guinea and to prevent it from being occupied by the Imperial Japanese. The force undertook defensive tasks and maintenance of the airfields, tracks and roads in the area, and undertook reconnaissance and long range patrols.

== History ==
On 23 January 1943, under instructions from New Guinea Force, the 6th Division dispatched a small force, known as Bena Force, from Port Moresby by air in six Douglas C-47s to the airfield at Bena Bena. The force consisted of 57 men of the 2/7th Battalion led by Lieutenant Rooke.

Under the command of Kanga Force, the force's objectives were to secure Bena Bena airfield against enemy attack, deny the Japanese freedom of movement in the Bena Bena Valley, and to harass and delay any Japanese movement in the area between Bena Bena and Ramu River. Bena Force was also made responsible for the small Australian New Guinea Administrative Unit (ANGAU) detachment under Captain John Black, a detachment of the Royal Australian Air Force (RAAF) Rescue and Communication Flight and a special operations unit operating out of Bena Bena.

The depleted 2/7th Independent Company, under the command of Major Thomas MacAdie, was flown to Bena Bena on 29 May 1943 to augment the force after the Japanese launched strong air attacks on Bena Bena. This brought the garrison up to a total of almost 400 men. During June and July, observation posts were established in the region, patrols were sent out and infrastructure was built with the help of labour supplied by the ANGAU. Later, during August and September, as attacks increased on the garrison, the 2/2nd Independent Company arrived to reinforce Bena Force and patrols were sent out through the Ramu Valley in order to observe the main approaches to Bena Bena.
