= 2/6th Cavalry Commando Regiment =

Cavalry regiment of the Australian Army

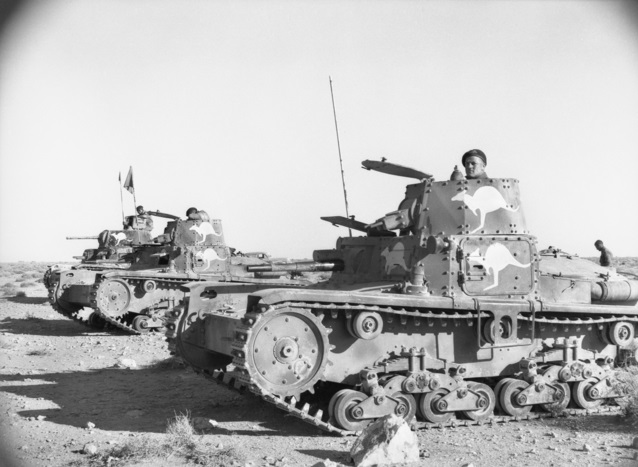
- M11/39s and an M13/40 of the 6th Australian Division Cavalry Regiment at Tobruk in January 1941
- Active: 1939–1945
- Disbanded: September 1945
- Country: Australia
- Branch: Australian Army
- Type: Commando
- Size: ~500 personnel all ranks
- Part of: 6th Division
- Engagements: Second World War: North African campaign; Syria–Lebanon campaign; New Guinea campaign; Aitape–Wewak campaign

Commanders
- First Commander: Maurice Ferguson
- Last Commander: Eric Hennessy

Insignia
- Unit colour patch

The 2/6th Cavalry Commando Regiment was a cavalry regiment of the Australian Army that served during the Second World War and was later converted into a commando unit. Formed at Ingleburn, New South Wales, in November 1939, it was originally raised as an armoured reconnaissance regiment attached to the 6th Division. In that role, the 2/6th saw action in the North Africa campaign and in the Middle East during 1940–41, where the regiment distinguished itself at Bardia, Tobruk and in Syria. Later, following Japan's entry into the war, the 6th Division was brought back to Australia and following a re-organisation, the regiment was converted into a cavalry commando regiment, incorporating the independent companies that had been formed at the start of the war. In late 1944, the 2/6th Cavalry Commando Regiment was deployed to New Guinea, where it participated in one of the final Australian campaigns of the war in the Aitape–Wewak area.

== History ==
=== Formation ===
The regiment was raised at Ingleburn, New South Wales, on 3 November 1939, as part of the Second Australian Imperial Force (2nd AIF), which was raised from volunteers for overseas service. Under the command of Lieutenant Colonel Maurice Fergusson, a First World War veteran who had previously commanded the 8th Light Horse Regiment while serving in the Militia during the inter war years, the regiment was assigned to the 6th Division and was named the "6th Division Reconnaissance Regiment". The cadre of commissioned and senior non-commissioned officers (NCOs) upon which the regiment was raised was drawn largely from the Militia and were selected by Fergusson or his adjutant, Captain Charles Finlay, a regular Army officer who would later go on to command the 2/24th Infantry Battalion and eventually reach the rank of major general and serve as commandant of the Royal Military College, Duntroon. The regiment's first regimental sergeant major was Eric Hennessy, who eventually rose to command the regiment.

Upon establishment, the regiment's personnel were drawn from all Australian states. It consisted of three fighting squadrons, 'A', 'B' and 'C'. 'A' Squadron was recruited from men from Queensland and New South Wales, while Victorians formed 'B' Squadron and 'C' Squadron consisted of troops from South Australia, Western Australia and Tasmania. Later, a headquarters squadron was formed, as was a regimental aid post. It took some time for the regiment to concentrate at Ingleburn and it was not until mid-December that the regiment's interstate recruits had arrived and training began. From the outset, the regiment was set apart from others by way of its distinctive headdress as it was issued with the black armoured corps beret, upon which members of the regiment wore the large Rising Sun hat badge. Its unit colour patch consisted of the same colours of the Royal Tank Corps – brown, red and green – which it wore in that order, in contrast to other armoured units which displayed the green followed by red and brown.

It took some time for the regiment to form and by the end of the first week of the regiment's existence there were only a total of 107 men on its books at Ingleburn. Initial training was only very rudimentary in nature, consisting mainly of drill and basic signals. Lacking vehicles, at the outset only limited driver training could be undertaken using private vehicles. Finally, on 13 November a quantity of weapons arrived for individual training and two days later a number of utility vehicles and lorries arrived. More involved signals and driver training followed and on 23 November, the regiment was inspected by the divisional commander, Lieutenant General Thomas Blamey.

Over the course of the next fortnight, personnel arrived from South Australia, Western Australia and Tasmania, however, it was not until mid-December that the regiment was fully concentrated at Ingleburn when the last troops arrived from Victoria. By this time, the decision had been made that the troops of the 2nd AIF would be sent to the Middle East to train while they waited for transportation to Europe, and on 15 December an advanced party of eight officers and NCOs from the regiment departed. Throughout December, the regiment received more advanced instruction in navigation and signals and two Vickers light tanks were received for training. Shortages prevented hands-on training on the new Bren light machine-gun and Boys anti-tank rifle, although demonstrations were provided, and live-firing was undertaken on the Vickers machine-gun before a period of leave was granted over the Christmas and New Year period.

After reforming, the regiment's dispatch to the Middle East was confirmed and it subsequently took part in a divisional march through Martin Place, Sydney, in full dress uniform on 4 January 1940, watched by over 500,000 spectators. Later that week, 10,000 civilians farewelled the regiment at a parade at Ingleburn.

=== Middle East 1940–1942 ===
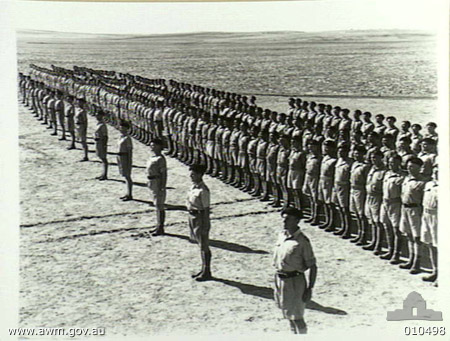
Parade of the 6th Australian Divisional Cavalry Regiment at Casa camp, September 1941.

The regiment had only been in existence for two months when it deployed overseas. Departing Sydney on the transport Strathnaver on 10 January, the 6th Division Cavalry Regiment would not make it to Europe. Instead, they would spend the best part of the next two years in the Middle East and would see action in Syria, Libya, Egypt and Lebanon against Vichy French, Italian and German forces. Arriving in Egypt on 12 February, they were initially sent to Palestine where they joined the rest of the 6th Division and began training on Bren carriers and six old Vickers light tanks. This training continued for most of the year, until December 1940 when the 6th Division moved into the Western Desert where they concentrated along with a large number of British troops in preparation for an offensive. Two days later, on 11 December 1940, the regiment – having been renamed the "6th Australian Division Cavalry Regiment" on 8 June 1940 – became the first unit of the 2nd AIF to see action in the war, when elements from 'B' Squadron fought a brief but sharp encounter with the Italian garrisons at Garn el Grein and Fort Maddalina on 11/12 December.

In January 1941, 'A' Squadron took part in the fighting around Bardia and then assisted the 19th Brigade in capturing Tobruk, during which time they used their Bren carriers and a number of captured Italian Italian M11 tanks, which were adorned with kangaroo symbols to distinguish them from Italian tanks. The regiment's use of tanks in this fighting was significant, representing the first time that Australian forces had operated tanks in action. After this, further actions were undertaken around Derna and Benghazi, before supporting the 18th Brigade's attack on Giarabub in March.

In April, the regiment received a number of Vickers light tanks and more Bren carriers from the 7th Division Cavalry Regiment, and the unit was re-organised at Helwan, near Cairo. At this time, the squadrons were organised into six troops, of which two would operate tanks and four would operate carriers. Further training was undertaken before the regiment moved to Mersa Matruh in the middle of the month. In mid-May, the regiment operated around Sollum in support of British troops during Operation Brevity before being moved to Palestine in May to join the 7th Division in the Syria–Lebanon campaign against the Vichy French.

After the start of the campaign in early June, the regiment took part in two main drives. The first of these was undertaken by the carrier troops from 'A' Squadron were attached to the 21st Brigade and took part in the coastal advance until being relieved by a squadron from the 9th Division Cavalry Regiment in mid-June. The squadron later received four French R35 Renault light tanks, which had been captured from the Vichy French, and on 20 June, 'A' Squadron was recommitted to the fighting, sending patrols towards Damour and to the north of Sidon. The second drive came in the centre, where 'C' Squadron was attached to 25th Brigade. Initially, 'B' Squadron was held back in reserve, but after 'C' Squadron's light tanks and carriers had taken part in sharp fighting around Fort Khirbe, it was committed to the advance up the Rosh Pinna Road, fending off assaults by Vichy French tanks before the fighting eventually ended in an armistice on 14 July.

During the campaign, the regiment was responsible for making a unique contribution to Australia's involvement to the war. Due to the rugged terrain along the Merdjayoun–Banis Road, which was unsuited to armoured vehicles, a small force of about 70 men drawn mainly from 'C' Squadron – later dubbed the "Kelly Gang" – were used to form a horse troop. Conducting patrols through the hills using horses that they had captured from the French, they were active until the armistice, and gathered important intelligence information and harassed the French by calling down artillery strikes.

=== Re-organisation 1942–1944 ===
Following the completion of the Syrian campaign in July, the regiment returned to Palestine in August, where a period of leave followed before the 6th Division Cavalry Regiment returned to Syria to undertake occupation duties around Aleppo and mount patrols along the Turkish border and the Euphrates. In November, the regiment was moved to Labboue, 15 miles (24 km) north of Baalbek where they endured harsh winter conditions while working to dig defensive positions as part of the Djedeide line. They remained there until March 1942, when the regiment was ordered to move to Palestine to return to Australia, following the outbreak of the Pacific War with Japan.

The regiment embarked on the United States Navy troop transport USS West Point at Suez and landed at Port Adelaide on 30 March, with a strength of just over 500 men of all ranks. After entraining, the regiment was moved to Tanunda in the Barossa Valley where it was billeted with the local population before concentrating at Warradale in mid-April. From there, a short period of inter-state leave followed. The following month, the regiment reformed at Ingleburn where the regiment undertook exercises using its Bren carriers. The 2/6th remained in New South Wales until June 1942, when the regiment was transported by train up the east coast of Australia to Townsville and then west to Mount Isa. From there, the regiment's vehicles were transferred to trucks for the remainder of the journey to the Northern Territory.

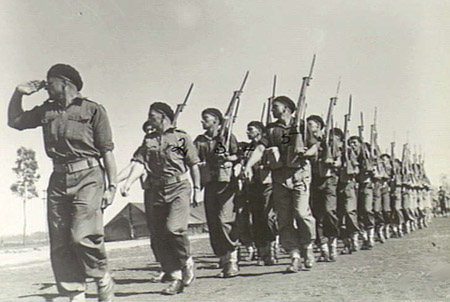
A parade on the Atherton Tablelands, Queensland, 11 September 1944. B Troop salutes during the march past.

Upon arrival in the Northern Territory, the regiment was sent to the Adelaide River, as part of "Northern Territory Force" where it was stationed in anticipation of a possible Japanese advance on mainland Australia. During this time, the regiment undertook further training. They also manned defensive positions and undertook long-range patrols from the Daly River to its confluence with Anson Bay, and undertook search and rescue operations for downed pilots. The regiment was re-designated the "2/6th Australian Cavalry Regiment" in early 1943, at which point the regiment's link to the 6th Division was broken. In July 1943, the regiment was relieved of its duties in the Northern Territory by the 8th Cavalry Regiment, and after being transported to Adelaide, a month of inter-state leave was granted.

The regiment reassembled in Murgon, Queensland, north of Brisbane, where they occupied the lines previously vacated by the 8th Cavalry Regiment. The change of location failed to provide the men with further opportunities for combat, though, and the lack of action resulted in poor morale amongst the regiment's personnel. Steadily the unit's strength fell as men sought transfer to units that were taking part in the fighting elsewhere; by November 1943 the regiment consisted of 26 officers and 254 other ranks.

On 2 December 1943, the unit's name was changed to the "2/6th Cavalry Commando Regiment". This was part of an Army-wide re-organisation as the focus of Australian land operations moved away from the Middle East towards the jungles of the Pacific and fighting the Japanese. As a result of this, it was decided to convert three 2nd AIF divisions – the 6th, 7th and 9th – into light infantry Jungle Divisions, equipped and trained especially for combat in the South-West Pacific. It was found that the armoured reconnaissance units of these divisions were not suited to serving in the Pacific and as such it was decided to disband these units and use their headquarters units to amalgamate the independent companies of commandos that had been raised at the start of the war.

At this time, the regiment's armoured vehicles were handed back to the Army and it was used as the administrative headquarters for three commando squadrons, the 2/7th, 2/9th and 2/10th Commando Squadrons. Shortly after this, the regiment moved to the Atherton Tablelands, taking up residence in a camp near Ravenshoe, where they began training for their new role.

=== South West Pacific 1944–1945 ===
After undertaking infantry and specialised jungle training for more than a year, the 2/6th Cavalry Commando Regiment finally received orders for overseas in October 1944. Once again the regiment was attached to the 6th Division. Initially it had been believed that the division would take part in the fighting in the Philippines, however, inter-Allied politics prevented this and the division was sent to New Guinea instead, where the individual squadrons, some of them having earlier distinguished themselves during previous campaigns in the South West Pacific as independent units, fought against the Japanese until the end of the war in the Aitape–Wewak campaign.

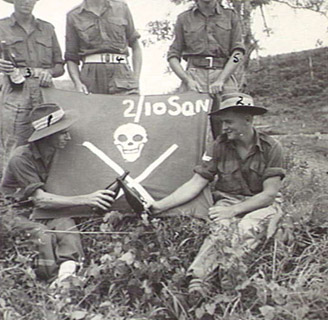
Karawop, New Guinea, 18 September 1945.

Embarking in Brisbane on the transport Katoomba, the regiment arrived at Aitape on 22 October 1944. Almost immediately the regiment began patrolling operations in the surrounding area and began the task of relieving the Americans as they awaited for the rest of the 6th Division to arrive. Once the 6th Division had concentrated in the area and completed the task of taking over from the American garrison, the regiment began reconnaissance and intelligence-gathering operations in the Torricelli Mountains, some 20 km south of Aitape, throughout November, in preparation for the coming offensive. During this time the regiment had a number of contacts with the enemy, the most notable of which occurred on 30 November 1944 when, for the loss of just one Australian, 73 Japanese were killed and seven were captured.

While the Americans that had previously held the area had undertaken a defensive campaign maintaining a series of standing patrols, the Australians decided to employ more aggressive tactics. The offensive began in mid-December and as the Australians advanced eastwards over the course of the following months, elements from the 2/6th found themselves involved in a number of roles, patrolling ahead of the rest of the 6th Division. Where necessary they were also used in a traditional infantry role to seize and hold ground, such as during the landings around Dove Bay in May, when the regiment was tasked with capturing the village of Sauri. This was achieved by the 2/7th Commando Squadron on 11 May when an attack was put in by two troops with artillery support, which resulted in two Australians and 16 Japanese killed and five Australians wounded. In June and July, the fighting began to draw to a close, and the regiment was used mainly in "mopping up" operations in the Boiken area, where Japanese raiding parties continued to cause havoc amongst the Australian forces right up until the end of the war. The danger continued after the war had officially come to an end. The regiment's final fatality came on 18 August when a trooper triggered a booby trap while on a patrol.

The regiment's casualties in this final campaign were high. There were 29 killed in action, nine died of wounds, four died in accidents, and 99 wounded in action. This is a total of 141 casualties. When this is compared with the overall total of 204 for the regiment for the entire war, it can be seen that the final campaign was the most costly. Against this, 778 Japanese were killed and 23 were captured by the 2/6th.

Following the cessation of hostilities in the Pacific, the regiment undertook guard duties at Boiken where a Japanese prisoner of war centre was established. While the men awaited transfer, educational programs were instituted to prepare the soldiers to return to civilian employment. The regiment was disbanded in September 1945, and the individual squadrons were slowly depleted of their manpower, as they were deemed surplus to requirements, their personnel either repatriated back to Australia for discharge, or used to fill gaps in other units that would be used later for occupation and garrison duties in Japan and elsewhere, before they were finally disbanded in early 1946.

== Commanding officers ==
The following officers served as the 2/6th Cavalry Commando Regiment's commanding officer:

- Lieutenant Colonel Maurice Fergusson (October 1939 – March 1941) (wounded in action);
- Major Stewart Morrison (March 1941 – June 1941);
- Lieutenant Colonel Denzil Macarthur-Onslow (June 1941 – April 1942);
- Lieutenant Colonel John Abbott (May 1942 – January 1944); and
- Lieutenant Colonel Eric Hennessy (January 1944 – September 1945).

== Decorations ==
Members of the regiment received the following decorations:

- 3 Distinguished Service Order;
- 9 Military Crosses;
- 1 Distinguished Conduct Medal;
- 12 Military Medals; and
- 57 Mentions in Despatches.

== Casualties ==
Throughout the entire war, out of a total of 2,051 personnel the 2/6th suffered a total of 204 casualties. These were:

- 40 were killed in action, 12 died of wounds, five died from accidents, 141 were wounded in action and six became prisoners of war.

== Battle honours ==
The regiment received the following battle honours for their service during the Second World War:

- North Africa 1940–41, Bardia 1941, Capture of Tobruk, Derna, Giarabub, Syria 1941, Merjayun, Adlun, Sidon, Damour, South West Pacific 1944–45, Liberation of Australian New Guinea, Abau–Malin, Anumb River, Maprik, Wewak, Wirui Mission.

The 2nd Cavalry Regiment was chosen by the past members of the 2/6th Cavalry Commando Regiment to hold and preserve these battle honours and on 9 October 1971 at a ceremonial parade the regiment was presented with a scroll and bronze plaque affiliating the two regiments.
