= 2/9th Commando Squadron (Australia) =

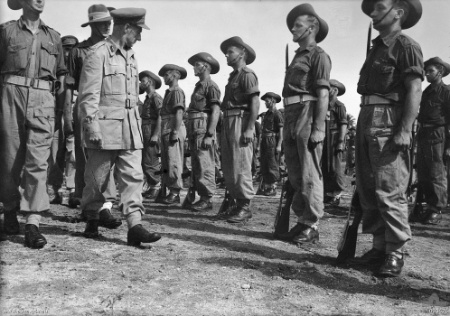
- 2/9th Commando Squadron being inspected by GOC 6th Division, Aitape, New Guinea, 17 April 1945.
- Active: 1944–1946
- Disbanded: Early 1946
- Country: Australia
- Allegiance: Australia
- Branch: Australian Army
- Type: Reconnaissance unit
- Role: Reconnaissance and long range patrols
- Size: 17 officers and 253 other ranks
- Part of: 2/6th Cavalry Commando Regiment, attached to Australian 6th Division
- Engagements: World War II: South West Pacific theatre; New Guinea Campaign; Aitape–Wewak campaign
- Battle honours: Nil

Commanders
- Notable commanders: Major Thomas Nisbet

Insignia
- Unit colour patch

The 2/9th Commando Squadron was a commando unit raised by the Australian Army for service in World War II. Raised in 1944, the unit saw action late in the war against the Japanese during the Aitape–Wewak campaign taking part in number of long range patrol operations across the Torricelli Range in New Guinea before being used in an amphibious landing near Wewak in May 1945. After the war the unit was disbanded.

== History ==
=== Formation ===
At the beginning of World War II, the Australian Army formed a number of independent companies which later became commando squadrons. Initially these units were formed with the intention of sending them to the Middle East to fight, however, following Japan's entry into the war and the subsequent shift in Australia's strategic focus, these units were employed in a variety of roles in the early stages of the fighting in the Pacific, serving with considerable distinction. In 1943–44, as part of a re-organisation of the Australian Army to prepare it for jungle warfare, these independent commando squadrons were re-organised into a regimental system underneath the headquarters of the divisional cavalry units of the 6th, 7th and 9th Divisions. As a part of this re-organisation, the 2/9th Commando Squadron was raised in January 1944, as part of the 2/6th Cavalry Commando Regiment, attached to the 6th Division. Like the other Australian commando squadrons, it had strength of 17 officers and 253 other ranks.

=== Aitape–Wewak campaign ===
Following the unit's formation, the squadron began training on the Atherton Tablelands in Queensland, before embarking for New Guinea in late 1944. In October 1944, the squadron was one of the first Australian combat units to relieve the American forces at Aitape. From there, it took part in the Aitape–Wewak campaign which saw the squadron undertake numerous long-range patrols across the Torricelli Range, as well as being utilised as normal line infantry when required. In this role they were utilised in May 1945 in an amphibious landing at Dove Bay, east of Wewak, as part of Farida Force.

During this landing, the squadron came ashore in the first wave of the assault force and was instrumental in establishing the beach head. Once the rest of Farida Force had landed, the squadron began patrolling operations along the coast to the west towards the town of Mandi. The patrol was carried out without contacting the Japanese, however, later, as they moved further west past Mandi, they came upon two stragglers. The next day, 'B' Troop's positions west of Mandi were mortared by the Japanese, and after a brief period of suppression fire from the beachhead, the troop attacked, taking the track junction and exploiting further westwards.

Later in May and into June 1945, the 2/9th were attached to the 19th Brigade and were given responsibility for defending the Bandi Plantation and the vital crossroads at Mandi. In late June, the infiltration of Japanese troops around Boiken threatened the security of the Australian positions and 2/9th along with the rest of the 2/6th Cavalry Commando Regiment were engaged in operations to deal with these threats. These raids continued through July and into August, before hostilities finally came to an end on 15 August 1945.

=== Disbandment ===
After the cessation of hostilities, the unit was slowly reduced as personnel were marched out for demobilisation or for service with the occupation forces in Japan. The remaining members of the squadron returned to Australia in December 1945, and in early 1946 the 2/9th was finally disbanded. During the squadron's service during the war, it lost 12 men killed in action. Members of the 2/9th received the following decorations: one Military Cross, one Military Medal and five Mentions in Despatches.

== Commanding Officer ==
The 2/9th Commando Squadron's commanding officer was:

- Major Thomas Granger Nisbet.

== See also ==
- South West Pacific theatre of World War II
- Pacific War
