= Aitape–Wewak campaign =

Campaign on the Pacific Theatre of WWII

- Part of World War II, Pacific War
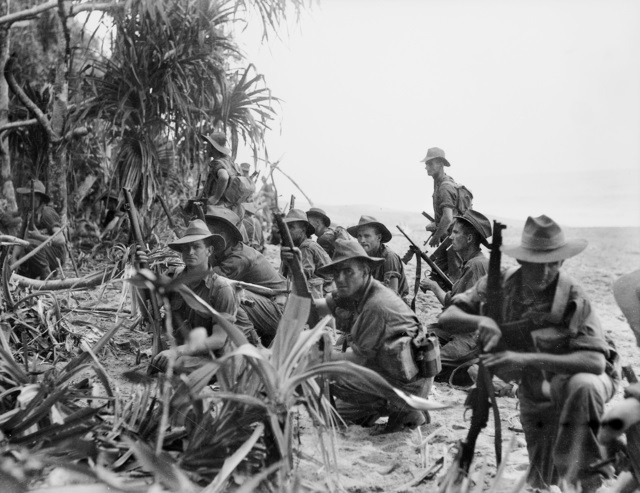
- Australian infantrymen resting on a river bank before attacking Japanese positions near Matapau in January 1945
Date	November 1944 – August 1945
Location	Aitape/Wewak/Sepik region, Territory of New Guinea
Result	Allied victory

Belligerents
Australia; United States; United Kingdom	Japan

Commanders and leaders
Jack Stevens	Hatazō Adachi

Strength
~13,000 men (Note: The Australian 6th Division had been converted to the jungle division establishment with a complement of 13,118 men, which was approximately 4,000 fewer than a standard Australian division. Palazzo 2001, p. 184.)	~30,000–35,000

Casualties and losses
442 killed in action; 145 dead from other causes; 1,141 wounded	7,000–9,000 killed in action; 14,000 dead from disease and hunger; 269 captured

The Aitape–Wewak campaign was one of the final campaigns of the Pacific Theatre of World War II. Between November 1944 and the end of the war in August 1945, the Australian 6th Division, with air and naval support, fought the Imperial Japanese 18th Army in northern New Guinea. Considered a "mopping up" operation by the Australians, and although ultimately successful for them with the Japanese forces cleared from the coastal areas and driven inland, amidst difficult jungle conditions, casualties from combat and disease were high. With Japan on the verge of defeat, such casualties later led to the strategic necessity of the campaign being called into question.

== Background ==
In 1942, the Japanese occupied the Aitape region in northern New Guinea as part of their general advance south. Throughout 1943 and into 1944, the Allies began a series of offensives in New Guinea and the surrounding area as they sought to reduce the main Japanese base around Rabaul on New Britain, as part of a general advance towards the Philippines that was planned for 1944 and 1945. On 22 April 1944, United States Army forces—primarily the 163rd Regimental Combat Team from the 41st Infantry Division—landed at Aitape and recaptured the area to help secure the flank of US forces fighting around Hollandia.

Following this, Aitape was developed as a base from which to support the continuing Allied drive towards the Philippines and the US forces in the area increased to include elements of the 31st and 32nd Infantry Divisions. Largely these forces stayed inside a small defensive area around the airfield, and apart from the Battle of Driniumor River in July, the fighting was limited. As preparations began for this drive, it was decided that defence of the area would be passed to Australian forces to release the American troops for service elsewhere. Consequently, in early October 1944, troops from the Australian 6th Division along with some support personnel from the 3rd Base Sub Area began to arrive at Aitape to relieve the American garrison. The first unit to arrive was the 2/6th Cavalry Commando Regiment and they began patrolling operations almost immediately.

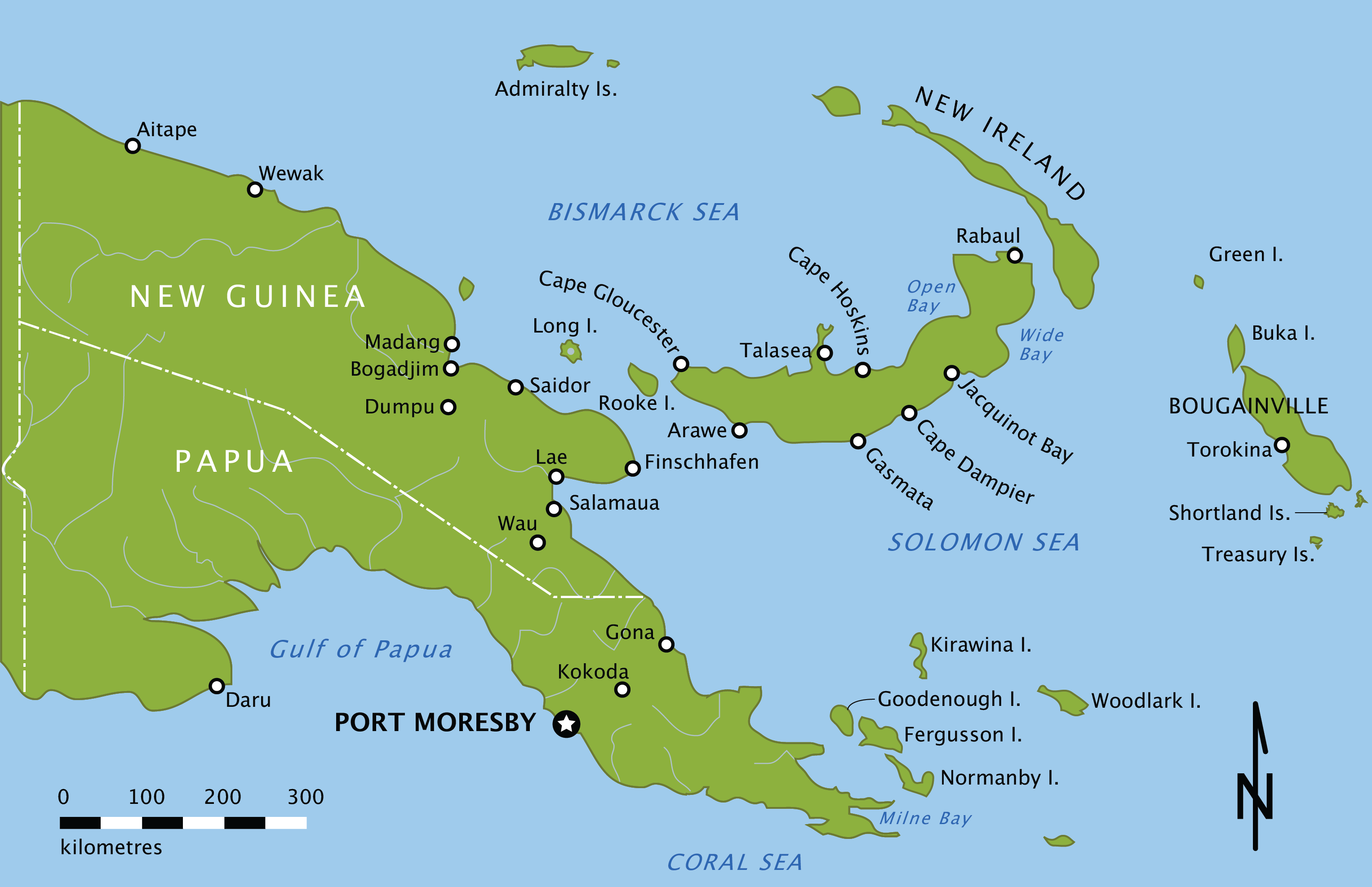
Location of New Guinea, including Aitape and Wewak

The Japanese troops in Aitape consisted of approximately 30,000 to 35,000 men from the Japanese 18th Army. This force had suffered heavily during the Salamaua–Lae campaign in 1943–1944, as well as its failed attack on the American garrison at Aitape in July 1944. As a result, the Australian planning staff believed they faced three Japanese divisions—the 20th, 41st and 51st Divisions—all of which had been reduced to brigade-strength. (Note: Allied intelligence estimated Japanese forces in the region to be between 24,000 and 30,000 men. Keogh 1965, p. 401.) The Japanese lacked air and naval support, and many troops were sick and short of food, with resupply efforts being limited to occasional deliveries by aircraft or submarines.

In contrast, the Australians were better equipped and better fed, and their medical and other support services were superior. They also had a moderate amount of air support, which was provided by No. 71 Wing RAAF, which included Nos. 7, 8 and 100 Squadrons, equipped with Beaufort light bombers, while aerial reconnaissance was provided by Boomerang and Wirraway aircraft of No. 4 Squadron. A naval force, known as Wewak Force, supported the landing at Dove Bay, and included HMA Ships Swan, Colac, Dubbo and Deloraine as well as ships from the 1st New Guinea M.L. Flotilla, under the command of Bill Dovers, captain of Swan.

== Battle ==
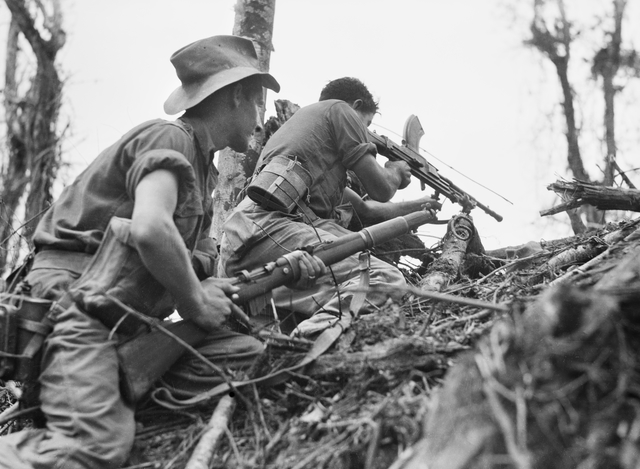
An Australian light machine gun team in action near Wewak in June 1945

Following their defeat on the Driniumor River in July, the Japanese commander, General Hatazo Adachi, withdrew his forces from their forward positions and in the lull that followed, Adachi's forces focused upon foraging operations into the Torricelli Mountains and Wewak as hunger and disease began to take their toll on the Japanese force. During this period there had been very little contact between the Japanese and US forces in the area, and US forces had remained on a primarily defensive footing, restricting their operations to limited patrols around their position on the Driniumor. The Japanese for their part, lacking significant air and naval assets, and low on ammunition and other supplies, had also sought to avoid engagement. Upon the arrival of the Australians, however, the 6th Division's commander, Major General Jack Stevens, decided to begin offensive operations, albeit on a limited scale, to clear the Japanese forces from the coastal area.

Initially tasked with the defence of the port, airfield and base facilities at Aitape, the 2/6th Cavalry Commando Regiment was ordered to advance towards Wewak to destroy the remnants of the Japanese 18th Army. Patrols by the 2/6th Cavalry Commando Regiment preceded the main Australian advance of the 6th Division. The attack, which began in November 1944, proceeded along two axes—the 19th Brigade moved along the coast towards the Japanese base at Wewak, while the 2/6th Cavalry Commando Regiment, working with ANGAU detachments, advanced into the Torricelli Mountains, driving towards Maprik, some 30km inland from the coast and some 90km south-east of Aitape. The region provided the Japanese in the Wewak area with a great many of their supplies. While the advance was under way, the 17th Brigade was assigned the task of building a defensive position around the airfield and base facilities at Aitape, while the 16th Brigade was held back in reserve.

On 19 December, the 19th Brigade crossed the Danmap River and began moving towards the east to cut the main Japanese line of communication. A series of minor actions followed, but no significant engagements took place, and at the end of four weeks the Australians had reached Wallum, about 45 miles (72 km) east of Aitape. A week later, on 24 January 1945, the 16th Brigade relieved the 19th, while the 17th Brigade continued the advance towards the west through the Torricellis.

The operations were characterised by prolonged small-scale patrolling with small-scale company attacks. Progress was slowed by the difficulties of transporting supplies overland or by barge and the flash flooding of a number of the rivers the Australians had to cross. In one incident, seven men from the 2/3rd Battalion drowned in the swollen waters of the Danmap River which had risen suddenly after a torrential downpour. After Dogreto Bay was occupied, the supply problems eased somewhat for the Australians. On 16 March 1945, the airfields at But and Dagua on the coast were occupied, although fighting continued further inland from there over the course of the following fortnight as the Australians fought to gain control of the Tokuku Pass. On 25 March, Lieutenant Albert Chowne, a platoon commander from the Australian 2/2nd Battalion led an attack on a Japanese position that was holding up the advance on Wewak. For his actions he was posthumously awarded the Victoria Cross. Heavy fighting continued for four days after this, and the Australians resorted to the use of flame throwers for the first time in the war, using them effectively against heavily entrenched Japanese positions; the weapon had a profound psychological effect, boosting the morale of the Australians and sapping that of the Japanese defenders, many of whom simply fled in the face of flame thrower teams.

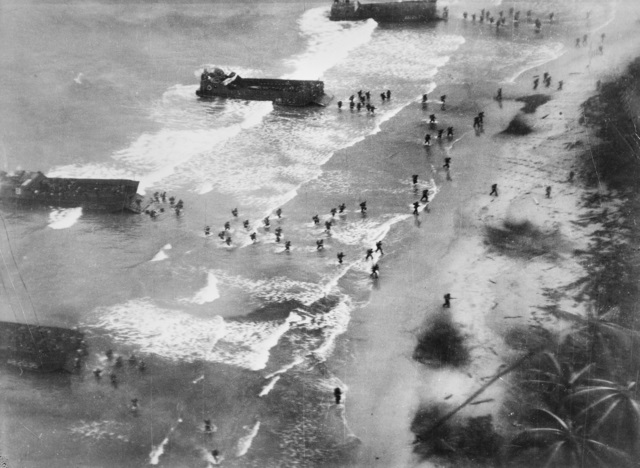
Farida Force landing at Dove Bay, May 1945

In the Torricelli Mountains, the 17th Brigade continued its advance against stubborn Japanese defence. By 23 April 1945, they had secured Maprik. The fall of Maprik allowed the Australians to begin constructing an airfield 8 miles (13 km) away at Hayfield, and this was completed on 14 May allowing reinforcements and supplies to be flown in. Elsewhere, the 19th Brigade had begun its assault on Wewak in early May. HMAS Hobart, Arunta, Warramunga, Swan and HMS Newfoundland (of the British Pacific Fleet) as well as the RAAF bombarded the Wewak defences. On 11 May, a landing at Dove Bay by Farida Force was undertaken to encircle Wewak and prevent the escape of its garrison. Wewak fell on the same day, as the 19th Brigade occupied its airfield. The fighting around Wewak Airfield continued until 15 May, when men from the 2/4th Battalion, with armoured support, attacked Japanese positions overlooking the airstrip. It was during this attack that Private Edward Kenna carried out the deeds that led to him being awarded the Victoria Cross, attacking several Japanese bunkers.

Following this, the remaining Japanese in the area withdrew into the Prince Alexander Mountains to the south of Wewak. To counter this, the 16th Brigade was dispatched to follow them up, and push them towards the 17th Brigade which advanced towards the east towards Maprik. Meanwhile, the 19th Brigade came up against strongly defended positions around several high features known as Mount Kawakubo, Mount Tazaki and Mount Shiburangu. This fighting took place throughout June and July. These operations continued until 11 August, by which time the 16th Brigade had reached Numoikum, about 23 kilometres (14 mi) from Wewak, while the 17th Brigade had captured Kairivu, 24 kilometres (15 mi) from Wewak. At this stage, word was received that the Japanese government had begun discussing terms for a possible surrender and so offensive operations were brought to a halt.

== Aftermath ==
By the end of the campaign, the Australians had lost 442 men killed and 1,141 wounded in battle. On top of this, a further 145 died from other causes, and 16,203 men were listed as "sickness casualties". Many of these casualties were the result of an atebrin-resistant strain of malaria that infested the area. Japanese casualties are estimated at between 7,000 and 9,000 killed while 269 were captured during the fighting. Following the end of hostilities in New Guinea, approximately 13,000 Japanese surrendered, with about 14,000 having died of starvation and illness during the entire campaign.

During the course of the campaign, the strategic necessity of the operation was called into question as it became clear that the fighting would have little impact upon the outcome of the war. In that regard, it was argued that the Japanese forces in Aitape–Wewak posed no strategic threat to the Allies as they advanced towards mainland Japan and that if they could be isolated and contained they could be left to "wither on the vine" as their supplies ran out. As such, the campaign has sometimes been referred to as an "unnecessary campaign", and General (later Field Marshal) Thomas Blamey, commander-in-chief of the Australian Military Forces, was accused of undertaking it for "his own glorification". Army officer and military historian Eustace Keogh concludes that "politically or strategically, the offensives on Bougainville and at Aitape–Wewak served no useful purpose".

Nevertheless, at the time that the operation was planned there was no way for the Australian commanders to know when the war would come to an end and there were political and operational reasons to carry out the campaign. By late 1944, the Australian Army had taken a secondary role in the fighting and there was a political need for Australia to demonstrate that it was sharing the burden in the Pacific. As New Guinea was an Australian territory at the time, it was argued that there was a responsibility to clear the Japanese from that area. Regardless, due to manpower shortages in the Australian economy, the government had requested that the Army find a way to reduce its size, while at the same time requiring it to maintain forces to undertake further operations against the Japanese into 1946. To do that, it was argued that there was a requirement to clear the Japanese that had been bypassed to allow the garrisons of these areas to be reduced.

== Notes ==
Footnotes

Citations
