= Maurice Fergusson =

Australian Army officer

Maurice Alfred Fergusson
- Born: 5 December 1895; Caulfield, Victoria
- Died: 27 September 1975 (aged 79); Dunedoo, New South Wales
- Burial place: Leadville, NSW
- Military career
- Allegiance: Australia
- Branch: Australian Army
- Service years: 1914–1919; 1926–1932; 1936–1945
- Rank: Brigadier
- Unit: 1st Field Artillery Brigade (1914–1919)
- Commands: 8th Infantry Brigade (1944–45); 2nd Infantry Brigade (1942–44); 2nd Armoured Brigade (1942); 1st Armoured Brigade (1942); 2/17th Battalion (1942); 6th Divisional Reconnaissance Regiment (1939–41); 8th Light Horse Regiment (1939)
- Conflicts: First World War; Gallipoli Campaign; Battle of Messines; Second World War; Siege of Giarabub; Syria-Lebanon campaign; New Guinea campaign
- Awards: Distinguished Service Order; Military Cross & Bar; Mentioned in Despatches (3); Efficiency Decoration

Brigadier Maurice Alfred Fergusson, DSO, MC & Bar, ED (5 December 1895 – 27 September 1975) was an Australian Army officer who served during both World Wars.

== Early life ==
Fergusson was born at Caulfield in Melbourne to Mauritian-born bank manager Ernest Fairchild Fergusson and Alfritha Elizabeth, née Turner. He attended University High School, Melbourne before working as a jackeroo and undergoing compulsory military training.

== Military career ==
Fergusson enlisted in the Australian Imperial Force on 24 August 1914 and was posted to Egypt in the 1st Field Artillery Brigade. He was promoted from gunner to bombardier in March 1915, landing at Gallipoli on 25 April. He was hospitalised in England for enteric fever from September. In July 1916 he was sent to the Western Front.

Fergusson was commissioned in December 1916 and promoted lieutenant in May 1917. Wounded at Messines on 7 June, he was mentioned in despatches. He was awarded the Military Cross (MC) after saving his battery's guns and many of his men near Cérisy-Gailly, winning a Bar to his MC for his actions from February to March. Injured in an accident in August, he was transferred to England and granted a disability pension, which he voluntarily surrendered in 1922. He married Effie Hazel Skinner at Southampton on 6 January 1916.

After the termination of his commission on 25 March 1919, Fergusson and his wife returned to Australia. Fergusson farmed at Whittlesea from 1927 and was a local councillor from 1930 to 1934, serving from 1931 to 1932 as president. In 1932, he contested the Victorian Legislative Assembly seat of Evelyn as an independent United Australia Party candidate, but was defeated.

Fergusson remained in the militia from 1926 to 1932 and rejoined in 1936. He was given command of the 8th Light Horse Regiment and promoted lieutenant colonel in 1939; on 13 October he returned to the AIF to take command of the 6th Divisional Reconnaissance Regiment. Posted to the Middle East from February 1940, Fergusson was wounded on 9 March 1941 at the siege of Giarabub in Libya and returned to Australia in June. He was awarded the Distinguished Service Order and again mentioned in despatches. He returned to active service in November, commanding the 2/17th Battalion from January to February 1942 in Syria. He returned to Australia in March and was promoted temporary brigadier in April, leading the 1st and 2nd Armoured and 2nd Infantry brigades from 1942 to 1944. Fergusson commanded the 8th Infantry Brigade from August 1944 in New Guinea, being mentioned in despatches a third time, and returned to Australia on 16 August 1945, where he was transferred to the Reserve as honorary brigadier.

== Later life ==
Fergusson stood for the Senate as a Liberal Party candidate in 1946, but was defeated. He moved to Inverell in New South Wales in 1946 and to the property "Moreton Bay" in New South Wales in 1949, farming near Leadville. In 1966 he retired to Sydney. Fergusson died at Dunedoo in 1975 and was buried in Moreton Bay; his wife and four of his six sons survived him (one, Terence, had been killed in action in 1942 in Papua).
