= Mount Sulen =

Mountain peak in Sandaun Province, Papua New Guinea

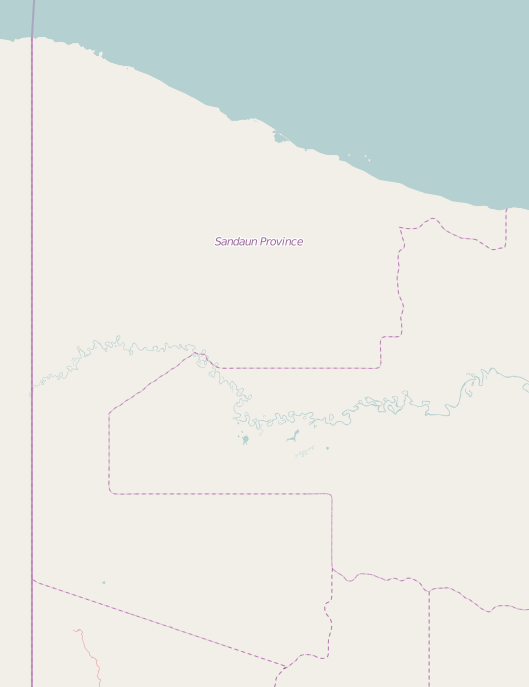
- Location within Sandaun Province

Highest point
- Elevation: 1,657 m (5,436 ft)
- Prominence: 1,145 m (3,757 ft)
- Listing: Ribu
- Coordinates: 3°25′S 142°11′E

Geography
- Location: Sandaun Province, Papua New Guinea
- Parent range: Torricelli Mountains

Sulen is an isolated mountain peak in Sandaun Province, Papua New Guinea. It is the highest peak in Torricelli Mountains.
