= Lee Kizzire =

American football player (1915–1943)

Profile
- Position: Running back

Personal information
- Born: December 21, 1915; Wyoming, U.S.
- Died: November 1943 (aged 27); Wewak, New Guinea †

Career information
- College: Wyoming

Career history
- 1937: Detroit Lions

Awards and highlights
- Wyoming Athletics Hall of Fame (2000)

Other information
- Military career
- Allegiance: United States
- Branch: U.S. Army Air Force
- Service years: 1942–1943
- Conflicts: World War II
- Awards: Purple Heart

William Lee Kizzire (December 21, 1915 – November 1943) was an American professional football player who played running back for one season for the Detroit Lions. Following his lone NFL season, he became a high school football coach.

On December 13, 1941, six days after the attack on Pearl Harbor and the United States' entry into World War II, Kizzire enlisted in the Army Air Corps and received his commission in July 1942. Unable to fit in fighter planes due to his size, he was assigned to bomber units. On September 2, he and four crewmen survived an accident during a routine flight over Columbia, South Carolina, when their plane's engine failed. Kizzire was later deployed to the Pacific theater, where he flew in bombing raids on Japanese communications lines and air bases; one mission in September 1943 saw him fly a North American B-25 Mitchell into the island of Wewak—the site of the largest Japanese airbase in mainland New Guinea—to destroy anti-aircraft positions at But Airfield.

On November 27, 1943, Kizzire was flying with the 345th Bombardment Wing's 498th Bomber Squadron near Wewak when he was shot down; his flight commander explained he "had his engine shot away and couldn't get enough power to get back so he had to land in the wrong territory." While his plane was found in a lagoon and its crew was spotted exiting the aircraft to reach airdropped Allied supplies, rescue efforts were unable to find them. Kizzire was initially believed to be captured by the Japanese and a Japanese propaganda broadcast referred to him as a prisoner of war, but he was declared dead on January 22, 1946. He received the Air Medal and Purple Heart.

== See also ==
- List of people who disappeared
