= Hatazō Adachi =

Japanese officer, war criminal (1890–1947)

- 安達 二十三
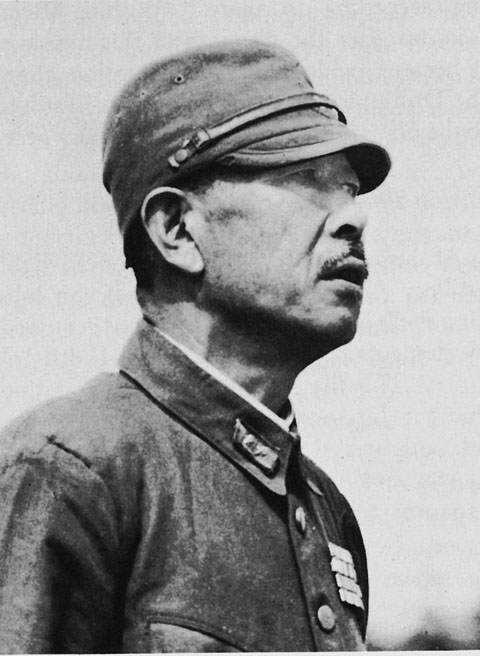
- Born: June 17, 1890; Ishikawa Prefecture, Japan
- Died: 10 September 1947 (aged 57); Rabaul, Bismarck Archipelago, Australia
- Education: Imperial Japanese Army Academy; Army War College
- Military career
- Allegiance: Empire of Japan
- Branch: Imperial Japanese Army
- Service years: 1910–1945
- Rank: Lieutenant General
- Units: 1st Imperial Guards Division; Railway Guard (Kwantung Army)
- Commands: IJA 12th Infantry Regiment; IJA 26th Infantry Brigade; IJA 37th Division; North China Area Army; IJA 18th Army
- Conflicts: Second Sino-Japanese War; Battle of Shanghai (WIA); Battle of South Shanxi; World War II; New Guinea campaign; Battle of the Bismarck Sea; Battle of Aitape
- Awards: Order of the Rising Sun, 1st Class

Hatazō Adachi (安達 二十三, Adachi Hatazō; 17 June 1890 – 10 September 1947) was a general in the Imperial Japanese Army during World War II.

== Early career ==
Adachi was born into an impoverished family, originally descended from samurai, in Ishikawa Prefecture in 1890 (the 23rd year of the reign of Emperor Meiji, which is why his father, who had been a professional officer in the Japanese military, chose the kanji for "23" to represent his given name "Hatazō"). Too poor to afford the military preparatory schools necessary for a career in the Imperial Japanese Navy, as a youth he tested into the fiercely competitive Tokyo Cadet Academy, which enabled him to enter the Imperial Japanese Army Academy, from which he graduated from the 22nd class in 1910.

Adachi served with the 1st Imperial Guards Division, and then graduated from the 34th class of the Army War College in 1922. Unlike many Army officers of his day, Adachi avoided involvement in the political factions which plagued the Japanese Army in the 1930s. After serving in a number of staff and administrative positions within the Imperial Japanese Army General Staff, Adachi was assigned to the Railway Guard unit of the Kwantung Army, responsible for the security of the South Manchuria Railway in 1933.

== Career ==
=== Second Sino-Japanese War ===
Adachi was promoted to colonel in 1934, and was given command of the IJA 12th Infantry Regiment in 1936. During the Battle of Shanghai of July 1937, Adachi also gained a reputation of leading his troops from the front, where the fighting was the thickest. He was injured by a mortar barrage in September, which permanently damaged his right leg.

He was promoted to major general in 1938, and promoted to commander of the IJA 26th Infantry Brigade. Adachi had a reputation as a "soldier's general", sharing the miserable living conditions of his troops and welcoming open discussion with his officer and staff.

Promoted to lieutenant general in August 1940, he was commander of the IJA 37th Division at the Battle of South Shanxi. In 1940, he became a Chief of staff of the North China Area Army from 1941 to 1942, during the height of its scorched earth campaigns against the Chinese forces.

=== Pacific War ===
On 9 November 1942, Adachi was appointed commander in chief of the newly formed 18th Army on Rabaul and the north coast of New Guinea from 1942 to 1945. The 18th Army contained the IJA 20th Division and IJA 41st Division, both of which arrived safely. However, the IJA 51st Division, including Adachi and his senior staff, came under Allied air attack while en route from Rabaul to Lae, in the Battle of the Bismarck Sea. All eight transport ships and four destroyers were sunk with the loss of 3,664 men, and only 2,427 men of the division were rescued.

With the defeat of the Imperial Japanese Navy in the Solomon Islands campaign, and with landings of US forces led by Douglas MacArthur at Aitape and Hollandia from 22 to 27 April 1944, the vast majority of Adachi's forces became isolated. His forces, suffering from malaria, heat exhaustion and malnutrition were rendered ineffective for the remainder of the war, despite Adachi's efforts to achieve some form of self-sufficiency by planting crops and giving priority in rations to the sick. As ammunition began to run low, many of Adachi's commanders resorted to banzai charges against the Allied beachhead at Aitape rather than surrender. By the end of the war in September 1945, most of his forces had been annihilated. Of Adachi's original 140,000 men, barely 13,000 were still alive when the war ended. He surrendered to the Australian 6th Division at Cape Wom, by Wewak, New Guinea.

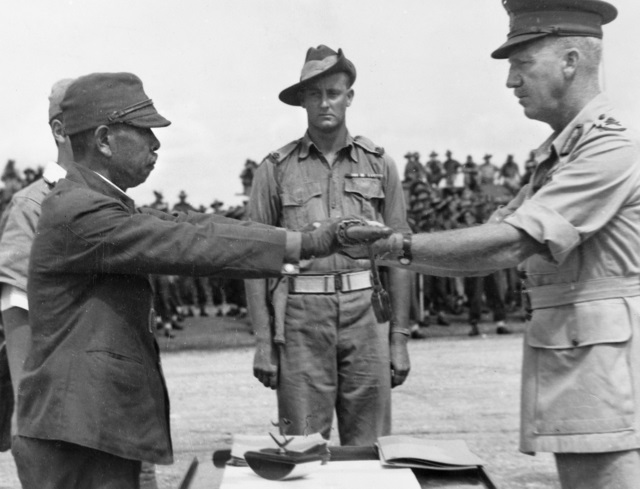
Major General Horace Robertson (right) accepts the sword of Japanese Lieutenant General Hatazō Adachi (left) with Major Douglas Burrows MBE (centre)

=== Postwar ===
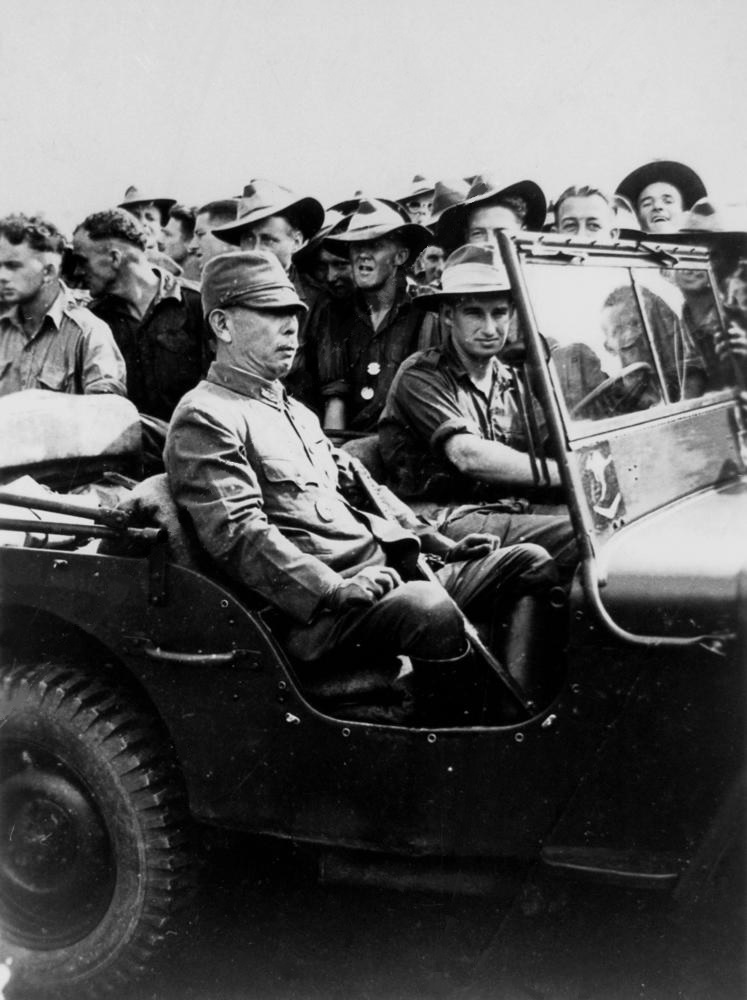
Adachi on his way to surrender.

At the end of the war, Adachi was taken into custody by the Australian government and charged with war crimes in connection with mistreatment and arbitrary execution of prisoners of war. Although not personally involved in any of the atrocities mentioned, Adachi insisted on absorbing command responsibility for the actions of his subordinates during the military tribunal. On 12 July 1947 he was sentenced to imprisonment for life. On 10 September that year he killed himself in his quarters with a paring knife in the prisoners' compound at Rabaul, having first written a number of letters.

In one of these, addressed to those officers and men of the Eighteenth Army who were then in the compound, he said:

"I felt it a great honour to have been appointed the C-in-C in November 1942, at a time when the issue of the day was to be settled, and posted to the point of strategic importance in order to ensure that the tide of war moved in our favour. I was thankful for that appointment. However, notwithstanding the fact that my officers and men did their best in the exceptional circumstances, surmounting all difficulties, and that my superiors gave the utmost assistance, the hoped-for end was not attained, because of my inability. Thus I paved the way for my country to be driven into the present predicament. The crime deserves death. During the past three years of operations more than 100,000 youthful and promising officers and men were lost and most of them died of malnutrition. When I think of this, I know not what apologies to make to His Majesty the Emperor and I feel that I myself am overwhelmed with shame . . . . I have demanded perseverance far exceeding the limit of man's endurance of my officers and men, who were exhausted and emaciated as a result of successive campaigns and for want of supplies. However, my officers and men all followed my orders in silence without grumbling, and, when exhausted, they succumbed to death just like flowers falling in the winds. God knows how I felt when I saw them dying, my bosom being filled with pity for them, though it was solely to their country that they dedicated their lives. At that time I made up my mind not to set foot on my country's soil again but to remain as a clod of earth in the Southern Seas with the 100,000 officers and men, even if a time should come when I would be able to return to my country in triumph."

== Notes ==
Government offices
Preceded by Harukichi Hyakutake	Commander of Occupied New Guinea; 1942–1945 with Hitoshi Imamura	Succeeded by Jack Keith Murray as Administrator of Papua and New Guinea
