= Cape Wom =

Cape near Wewak, Papua New Guinea

Coordinates: 3.520756°S 143.592969°E

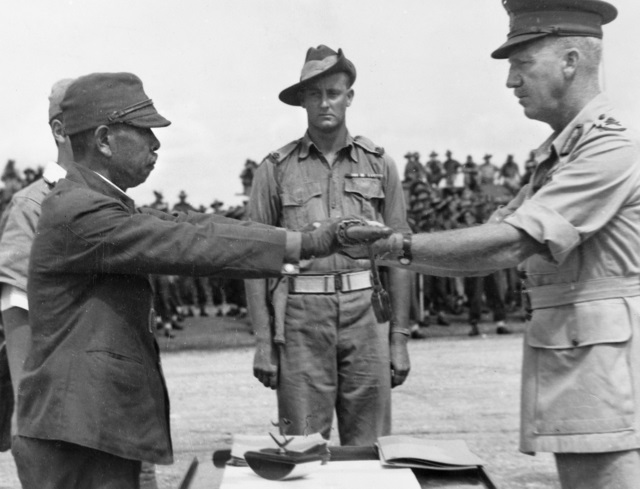
Japanese surrender at Cape Wom

Cape Wom is a cape (or small peninsula) near Wewak, Papua New Guinea, pointing into the Dogreto Bay of the Bismarck Sea.

It was the location of the unconditional surrender by Lieutenant General (Lt Gen) Hatazo Adachi, Commander of the Japanese 18th Army in New Guinea on September 13, 1945. A Cape Wom Memorial Park with the Surrender Memorial is located at the spot.
