= Australian commandos =

Australian special forces

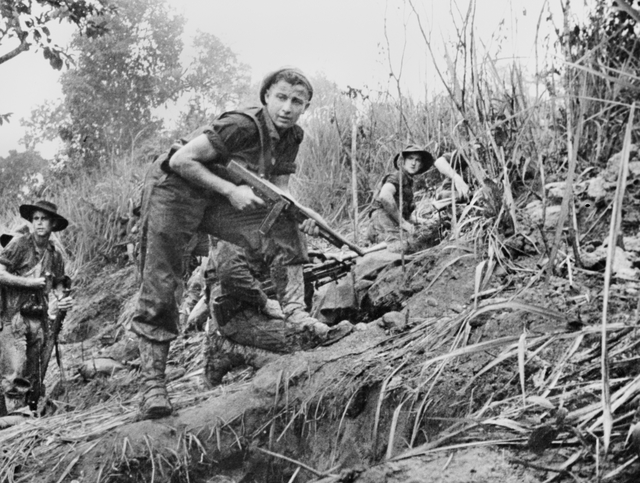
Australian commandos from the 2/3rd Independent Company during WW II, shortly before making an attack on Timbered Knoll in the Salamaua Area of New Guinea.

The name commando has been applied to a variety of Australian special forces and light infantry units that have been formed since 1941–42. The first Australian "commando" units were formed during the Second World War, where they mainly performed reconnaissance and long-range patrol roles during Australia's campaigns in New Guinea and Borneo, although other units such as M and Z Special Units performed more clandestine roles. These units were disbanded following the end of the war; however, in the 1950s it was realised that there was a need for such units again in the Australian forces. In the 2020s, the Australian Army possesses a number of units that perform more conventional direct-action type commando roles, as well as counter-terrorism response, long-range patrolling, and clandestine deep-penetration operations.

== History ==
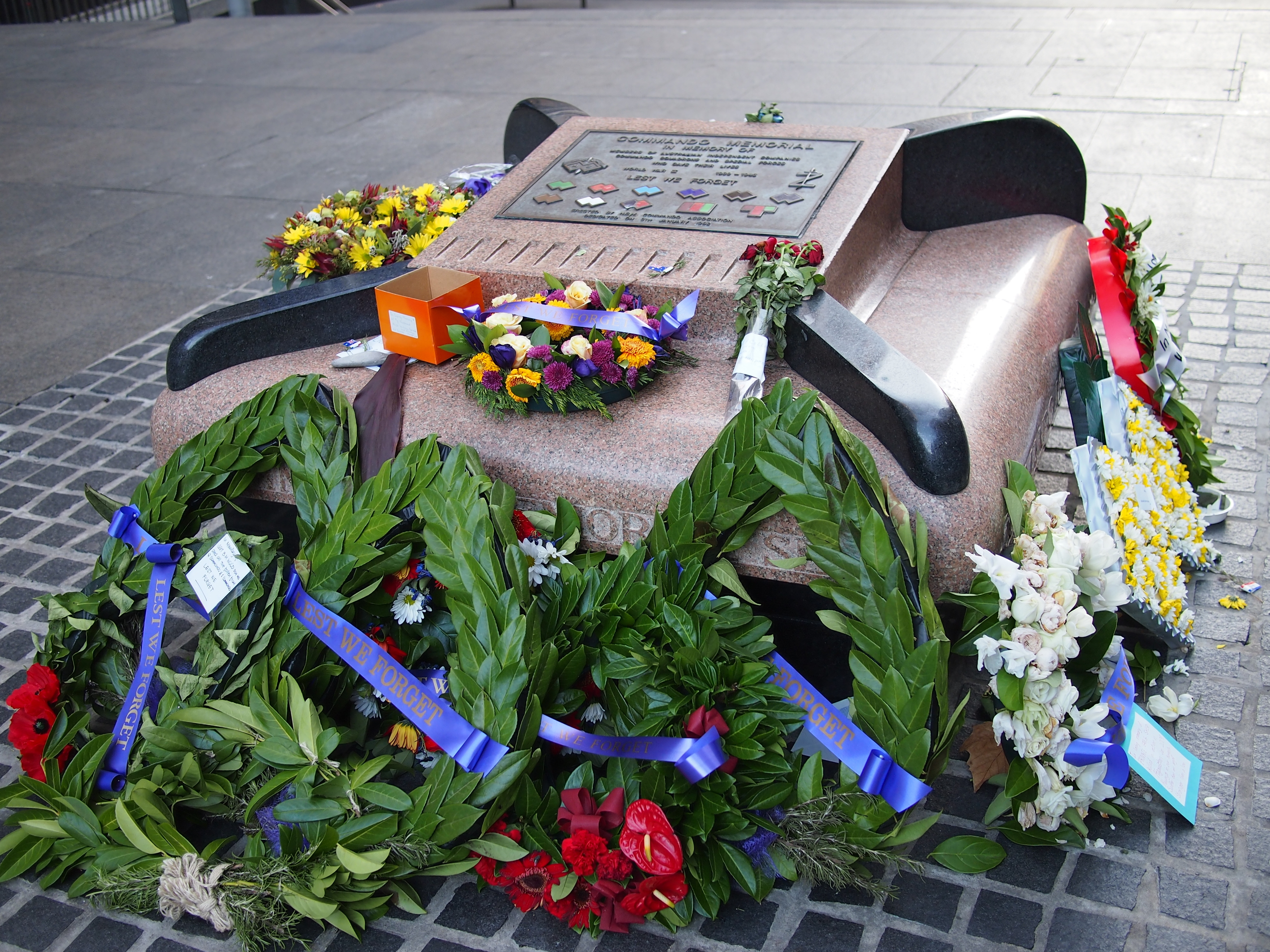
The Commando Memorial in Martin Place, Sydney

=== Second World War (1939–1945) ===
2/1 IC

2/2 IC

2/3 IC

2/4 IC

2/5 IC

2/6 IC

2/7 IC

2/8 IC

NGAWW

2/6 CavCdo Regt

2/7 CavCdo Regt

2/9 CavCdo Regt

During the Second World War, the Australian Army raised a number of units that were designated as carrying out commando-type operations. The first of these units were the independent companies, which were raised over a period of twelve months between 1941 and 1942. These units would go on to carry out various roles during the campaigns in New Guinea and Borneo and their members would serve with considerable distinction. Later, following a reorganisation, they would be designated as fully-fledged "Commando" squadrons. Other units were raised, such as the special units, whose tasks would be somewhat more clandestine. The Royal Australian Navy (RAN) also raised commando units during the war, employing them mainly in the role of beach parties and underwater clearance teams.

==== Independent companies ====
At the beginning of the Second World War, the Australian Army did not possess any "special forces" units. Late in 1940, the British government sent a military mission to Australia, headed by Lieutenant-Colonel J.C Mawhood, to investigate the possibility of establishing a number of such units within the Australian Army. The British proposed the establishment of independent companies that would receive special training in order to take part in combined operations and various other tasks, including "...raids, demolitions, sabotage, subversion and organising civil resistance". This was a very broad notion of the role that the independent companies would play, and there was considerable confusion over how these units would be used; for a while, this uncertainty threatened the very existence of the independent company concept.

Acting on British advice, the Australian Army began raising and training the 2/1st Independent Company in March 1941. Formed from volunteers from all branches of the Australian military, they were initially modelled upon the British Army Commandos and began training at the 7th Infantry Training Centre, Guerrilla Warfare School, at Wilson's Promontory, Victoria. Of those who trained the first Australian commandos were renowned British commandos Mike Calvert and F. Spencer Chapman. By halfway through 1941, a total of three companies had been raised and trained and a fourth one had commenced training. At this stage it was decided to discontinue training due to troubles with the concept and a lack of consensus regarding the independent companies' future involvement in operations; however, in December 1941, with Japan's entry into the war, problems with the concept and the training course were ironed out, and more independent companies were raised, until there were eight in total. In addition, the New Guinea Air Warning Wireless Company provided surveillance teams behind Japanese lines throughout Papua, New Guinea and the surrounding area.

These first units were:

- 1st Independent Company (raised May/June 1941)
- 2nd Independent Company (raised Oct 1941)
- 3rd Independent Company (raised Oct 1941)
- 4th Independent Company (raised December 1941)
- New Guinea Air Warning Wireless (Independent) Company (raised January 1942)
- 2/5 Independent Company (raised March 1942)
- 2/6 Independent Company (raised March 1942)
- 2/7th Independent Company (raised March 1942)
- 2/8th Independent Company (raised May 1942)

Initially the independent companies were raised to serve alongside the Second Australian Imperial Force (Second AIF) in the Middle East; however, as the threat from Japan developed it was decided to use them in the Pacific theatre, in the islands to the north of Australia where it was necessary to establish outposts to warn of the approach of Japanese forces. Their mission would then be to remain behind and harass the invading Japanese forces.

The first Australian commando unit to see action was the 1st Independent Company. Many of its members were killed or captured in defending the island of New Ireland (part of the Australian territory of New Guinea), from Japanese marines in early 1942. Other detachments of the company served on Bougainville, Manus Island, and Tulagi. A composite platoon was later sent to Wau in March 1942, eventually becoming part of Kanga Force.

The 2nd Independent Company performed with considerable success during the Timor campaign of 1942–43, conducting a guerrilla style campaign and occupying the attention of an entire Imperial Japanese Army division for almost twelve months. On return the 2nd Independent Company was redesignated as the 2/2 Independent Company, and then later the 2/2nd Commando Squadron and was one of only two of the original independent companies to remain operationally independent, outside a regimental structure. (Note: The other unit to remain independent was 2/8th Commando Squadron.) By the end of the war the 2/2nd Commando Squadron could "...claim to have spent longer in contact with the enemy than any other unit of the Australian Army" and indeed their success was later used as a model of SAS training.

Other companies/squadrons served in other parts of New Guinea and the Dutch East Indies, also serving with considerable distinction, mainly performing roles such as long range reconnaissance, intelligence gathering and flank protection, but also occasionally being called upon to perform more traditional infantry roles. The 2/6th Independent Company also captured and held the village of Kaiapit and after the Battle of Buna–Gona where it served alongside the Americans, and was singled out for rare praise from General Douglas MacArthur. (Note: MacArthur praised the unit for its contribution to the campaign in his 9 January 1943, Order of the Day. See Trigellis-Smith 1992, p. 118 and 144.)

===== Re-organisation 1943 =====
In mid-1943, the Australian Army re-organised its six front-line divisions as light infantry Jungle Divisions. As the three Second Australian Imperial Force (AIF) divisions' armoured reconnaissance regiments were considered to be unsuited to jungle terrain, having been raised for service originally in the Middle East and North Africa, their cavalry squadrons were disbanded. The regimental headquarters of the disbanded units were then used to command and administer the independent companies, as they were amalgamated into a regimental structure. Subsequently, the independent companies were redesignated as "Cavalry Commando Squadrons" and later, in 1944, this was simplified to "Commando Squadrons".

As a part of this re-organisation, the following regiments were formed:

- 2/6th Cavalry Commando Regiment (attached to the Australian 6th Division)
  - 2/7th Commando Squadron
  - 2/9th Commando Squadron
  - 2/10th Commando Squadron
- 2/7th Cavalry Commando Regiment (attached to the Australian 7th Division)
  - 2/3rd Commando Squadron
  - 2/5th Commando Squadron
  - 2/6th Commando Squadron
- 2/9th Cavalry Commando Regiment (attached to the Australian 9th Division)
  - 2/4th Commando Squadron
  - 2/11th Commando Squadron
  - 2/12th Commando Squadron

In the last year of the war, the eleven (Note: The nine units listed above (2/3, 2/4, 2/5, 2/6, 2/7. 2/9, 2/10, 2/11 and 2/12), plus the 2/2 and 2/8 which remained independent until the end of the war. The twelfth commando unit, 1st Independent Company, was not re-raised after most of its members were either killed or captured during fighting on New Ireland in 1942.) commando squadrons fought in Borneo, New Guinea and Bougainville. During these campaigns they were largely used in more traditional infantry roles, mainly performing tasks that could arguably have been successfully undertaken by normal infantry units. Although they undoubtedly performed these roles with considerable distinction, there were those within the Australian Army high command that felt that this proved the traditional argument against irregular warfare type units, (Note: Largely that they drain manpower and materiel resources from the Army as a whole for arguably little benefit.) and arguably this led to further ambivalence—even resistance—in the Australian Army high command towards so-called "special forces" which was later to hinder the formation of other such units after the war.

==== M & Z Special Units ====
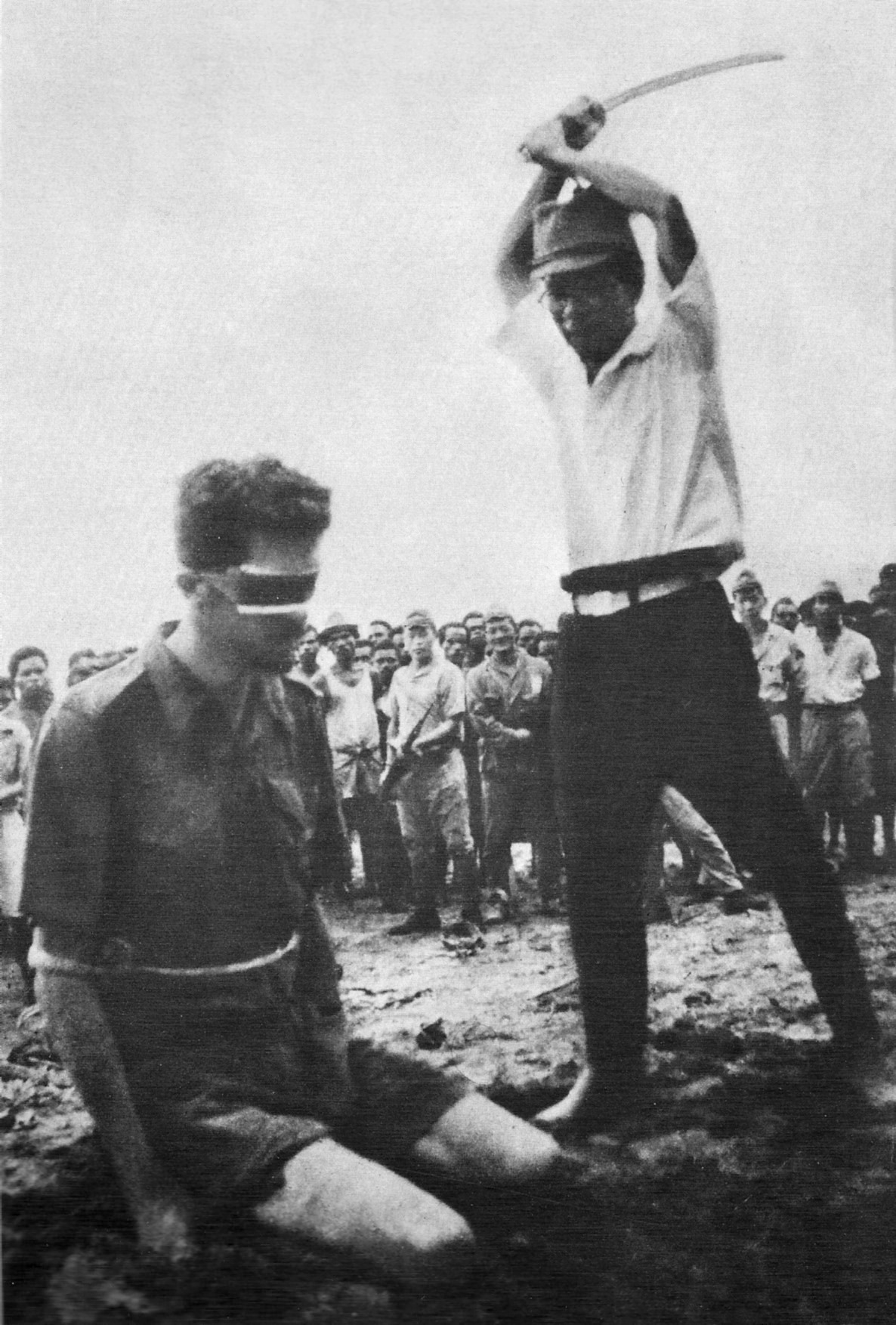
Sergeant Leonard G. Siffleet of M Special Unit being beheaded by a Japanese soldier, Yasuno Chikao, on 24 October 1943. AWM photo.

With the outbreak of war in the Pacific, two multi-national combined forces commando units were formed as part of the Allied Intelligence Bureau (AIB), attached to its Special Operations Australia (SOA) branch. These units were M Special Unit (primarily a coastwatching unit) and the more famous Z Special Unit (also known as Z Force), and they were to be used by the Allies to conduct covert operations in the South West Pacific Area against the Japanese. These units were formed with volunteers from all branches of the military and from personnel from Australia, Britain, New Zealand, and the Netherlands-East Indies.

M Special Unit was used primarily to provide intelligence on Japanese naval and troop movements around New Guinea and the Solomon Islands, with personnel being inserted along the coast behind enemy lines where they would observe enemy movements and report back to the AIB via radio. This was invisible, unglamorous work, but there were considerable dangers involved for those involved and a number of M Special Unit members were captured by the Japanese and executed. Z Special Unit's role was perhaps a little more glamorous and certainly since the war it has received a considerable amount of publicity. Members of the unit distinguished themselves in a number of daring clandestine raiding operations often using Australian built Folding kayaks (Folboats) to penetrate enemy areas. Some of these met with limited success or failed completely. During Operation Jaywick, members of the unit posed as an Asian fishing boat crew in order to infiltrate Singapore Harbour, where it successfully mined and destroyed seven Japanese ships, amounting to 35,000 tons, in September 1943. However, in 1944 the similar but larger Operation Rimau, which also targeted shipping at Singapore Harbour, resulted in the loss of all 23 personnel involved.

==== RAN Beach Commandos ====
Later in the war, the Royal Australian Navy also formed a number of commando units. These units were used to go ashore with the first waves of major amphibious assaults, to mark out and sign post the beaches and to carry out other naval tasks. These units were known as RAN Beach Commandos, and they took part in the Borneo campaign, being used in the landings at Tarakan, Balikpapan and Brunei and Labuan.

=== Post-Second World War ===
1st Commando Regiment unit colour patch

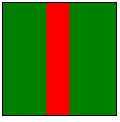
4 RAR (Cdo) unit colour patch

After the war, the existing commando units were disbanded as the focus of Australian defence planning returned to the old concept of supplying troops under Commonwealth defence arrangements.

In 1955, following a liaison visit to Malaya by Lieutenant-General Sir Henry Wells, the need to preserve the skills possessed by the Second World War units was realised as it became clearer that there was a role for Australian special forces within the Southeast Asian region. However, financial constraints and possibly an institutional phobia of "special forces" limited the commitment that the Australian Army could make to the concept, and consequently, it was decided that any such units raised would have to be drawn from the Citizens Military Force (CMF), (Note: The name of the CMF was changed to Australian Army Reserve in 1980.) as the army reserve was known at the time. As a result, two CMF Commando companies were raised: 2 Commando Company (2 Cdo Coy) in February 1955, based in Melbourne, and 1 Commando Company (1 Cdo Coy) in July 1955, based in Sydney. These units drew their heritage from the commando units raised during the Second World War, and a number of their senior cadre staff had served in these units.

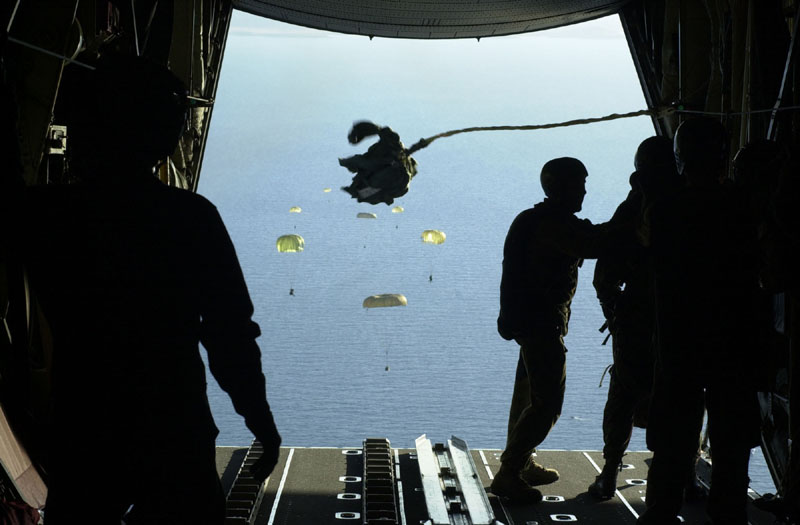
Soldiers from the 1st Commando Company parachute with their inflatable boats from an RAAF C-130H into Shoalwater Bay

Some members of these companies went on to assist and/or join the new Special Air Service Regiment (SASR), when it was raised, from 1957. However, the commando units retained a separate identity, with an emphasis on raiding and larger offensive operations, rather than the special reconnaissance and "surgical strike" role that was the classic function of SAS units.

In February 1981, it was decided to unite the two commando companies under a single headquarters unit. As a result, 1 Commando Regiment (1 Cdo Regt) was formed at Randwick, New South Wales to oversee the two reserve companies, although 2 Coy remained in Melbourne. In addition, 126 Signal Squadron (Special Forces), based in Melbourne, was incorporated to provide long-range communications support.

A regular light infantry unit, 4th Battalion, Royal Australian Regiment (4 RAR) was converted into a commando role in 1996, in order to provide a full-time commando capability within the regular army. 126 Signal Squadron was incorporated to provide signal support (301 Signal Squadron was re-raised to refill the role within the 1st Commando Regiment). Subsequently, 4 RAR was renamed 4 RAR (Cdo) until 19 June 2009, when it was again renamed, becoming 2nd Commando Regiment (2 Cdo Regt). This unit is largely used in the traditional commando role, and is heavily involved in combat operations in Afghanistan.

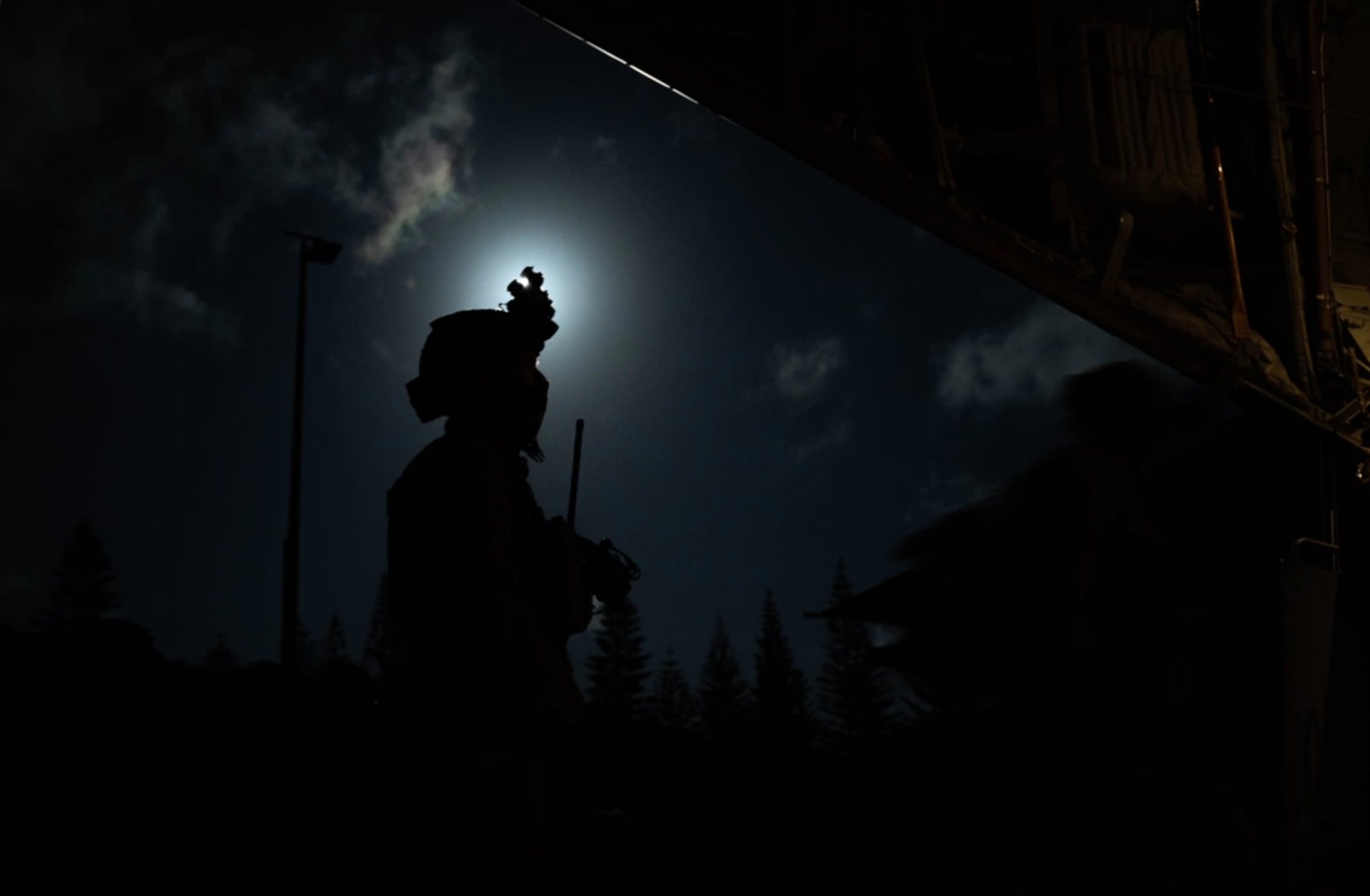
2nd Commando Regiment operator waits to board a U.S. Air Force MC-130J during Talisman Sabre 23 at Norfolk Island, August 2023

2 Cdo Regt also has a counter-terrorism function within Australia, providing members to the Tactical Assault Group – East (TAGEAST), to perform the same role on the eastern seaboard that the SASR provides on the western seaboard. In May 2003, Special Operations Command (Australia) was established as the administrative and operational headquarters for all of Australia's special forces and commando units.

== Current organisation ==
The commando units currently active in the Australian Army are:

- 1st Commando Regiment
- 2nd Commando Regiment (formerly 4th Battalion, Royal Australian Regiment)

Australian commandos have recently been employed on operations in a number of theatres, including Bougainville, East Timor, Iraq, Afghanistan and the Solomon Islands.

== Notes ==
Footnotes

Citations
