= But Airfield =

Airport in Papua New Guinea

Coordinates: 6°S 147°E

But Airfield, also known as But West to the Japanese and But Drome to the Allies, is a former World War II airfield near But, Papua New Guinea. It was primarily used for light and medium bombers.

== History ==
But Airfield was built by the Imperial Japanese Army beginning on 6 February 1943. Initially the field consisted of one runway that was 1200m x 80m. Australian forces captured the airfield in April 1945, repaired the runway and continued to use the airfield.

By the end of the war the runway had been expanded to over 1500m and 29 revetments. Additionally there were 17 revetments for bombers on the north side and another 12 on the south side. Two searchlight batteries and 16 anti-aircraft guns (8 heavy and 8 light were employed in its defense.

The airfield was abandoned after the war.

== Units based at airfield ==
- 23rd Sentai Nakajima Ki-43
- 26th Sentai Mitsubishi Ki-51
- 74th Air Company
