= Torricelli Range =

Mountain range in Papua New Guinea

Torricelli Mountains
- Location within Papua New Guinea

Highest point
- Peak: Mount Sulen
- Elevation: 1,657 m (5,436 ft)

Geography
- State: Papua New Guinea
- Range coordinates: 3.383333°S 142.25°E

The Torricelli Mountains are a mountain range in Sandaun Province, north-western Papua New Guinea. The highest peak in the range is Mount Sulen at 1657 meters. Adjacent to the range is the Bewani Mountains located to the west and the Prince Alexander Mountains located to the east. To the north, the mountains slope down to the Pacific Ocean, and to the south lies the basin of the Sepik River. The mountains are named after the Italian physicist and mathematician Evangelista Torricelli during the German colonial period.

Dozens of Torricelli languages are spoken within this mountain range.

== Ecology ==
The portion of the range above 1000 meters elevation is home to the Northern New Guinea mountain rain forests ecoregion, which also extends across portions of the neighboring ranges. The slopes below 1000 meters are part of the Northern New Guinea lowland rain and freshwater swamp forests.

Two of the most endangered mammals in the world, Scott's tree-kangaroo (Dendrolagus scottae) and golden-mantled tree-kangaroo (Dendrolagus pulcherrimus), live in the mountains' rainforest. Discovered in 1981, the critically endangered northern glider (Petaurus abidi) occurs exclusively in an area of less than 100 km^{2} in the Torricelli Mountains.
