= Murray Moten =

Australian military officer (1899–1953)

Brigadier Murray John Moten CBE, DSO & Bar, ED
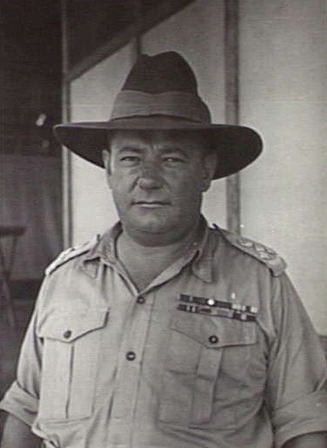
- Brigadier Murray Moten in New Guinea in late 1945
- Born: 3 July 1899; Hawker, South Australia
- Died: 14 September 1953 (aged 54); Adelaide, South Australia
- Military career
- Allegiance: Australia
- Branch: Australian Army
- Service years: 1916–1918; 1923–1953
- Rank: Brigadier
- Unit: 48th Battalion
- Commands: 9th Brigade (1948–1952); 6th Division (1945–1946); 17th Brigade (1941–1945); 2/27th Battalion (1940–1941); 48th Battalion (1939–1940); 43rd/48th Battalion (1936–1939)
- Conflicts: World War II; Syria-Lebanon campaign; Battle of Wau; Salamaua–Lae campaign; Aitape-Wewak campaign
- Awards: Commander of the Order of the British Empire; Distinguished Service Order & Bar; Mentioned in Despatches (2); Efficiency Decoration

Brigadier Murray John Moten, CBE, DSO & Bar, ED (3 July 1899 – 14 September 1953) was a senior officer in the Australian Army during World War II who commanded the 2/27th Battalion during the Syria-Lebanon campaign in 1941, and the 17th Brigade during the Salamaua–Lae campaign in 1943 and the Aitape–Wewak campaign in 1944–1945.

== Early life and World War I enlistment ==
Murray John Moten was born on 3 July 1899 at Hawker, South Australia, the eldest son of John Moten and Maude Mary Sophia, née Murray. Moten's father was an Australian-born railway porter and his mother was a nurse, originally from Ireland. Murray attended primary schools at Port Augusta, the state capital Adelaide, and in the far north town of Mingary, then Mount Gambier District High School in the south-east of the state. In 1913 he joined the junior cadets. He started as a messenger boy at the Mount Gambier post office in January 1915. Within six months he was working as a clerk in the town's branch of the Savings Bank of South Australia. In August 1916, he was commissioned as a second lieutenant in the senior cadets.

In August 1917 Moten enlisted for overseas service in the Australian Imperial Force, not long after he turned 18, by which time his mother had died. Moten was sent on leave – apparently suffering from flat feet – but was discharged as medically unfit due to heart problems and poor physique in January 1918. Moten returned to civilian life and was transferred to the head office of the Savings Bank of South Australia in Adelaide.

== Between the wars ==
Having resigned from the senior cadets, Moten was appointed as a provisional lieutenant in the part-time 48th Battalion, Citizens Forces, in July 1923. He undertook further studies, studying accountancy at the University of Adelaide in 1924. On 6 January 1926, Moten was promoted to captain. Ten days later he married Kathleen Meegan, a 28-year-old musician, at St Mary's Catholic Church, Port Adelaide. On 29 May 1929 Moten was promoted to major.

In 1930, with austerity measures from the Great Depression biting and the election of the Scullin Labor government, universal service was suspended, and due to falling volunteer numbers, the 48th Battalion was amalgamated with the 43rd Battalion to form the 43rd/48th Battalion. At the same time, the Citizens Forces were renamed the Militia. Moten was elected the President of the Bank Officials' Association of South Australia in 1934. On 17 December 1936, Moten was promoted to lieutenant colonel and took command of the 43rd/48th Battalion. By October 1938, Moten was working as a sales clerk in the mortgage department of the Savings Bank of South Australia.

== World War II ==
Two months after the outbreak of World War II, the 43rd/48th Battalion was delinked to again form separate battalions. Moten took command of the 48th Battalion, which was not immediately mobilised and remained on part-time service. On 29 February 1940, Moten was awarded the Efficiency Decoration, which was issued to part-time officers for 20 years of efficient commissioned service. On 26 April, Moten joined the all-volunteer Second Australian Imperial Force (Second AIF), and was appointed as the commanding officer of the 2/27th Battalion at the substantive rank of lieutenant colonel. He was accepted despite having reduced vision in one eye. The battalion was raised at Woodside, South Australia, on 7 May, where it began basic training. Along with the 2/14th and 2/16th Battalions, the 2/27th was attached to the 21st Brigade, which formed part of the 7th Division, the second infantry division raised as part of the Second AIF. With an authorised strength of 910 men of all ranks, it was organised into: four rifle companies designated "A" to "D"; a battalion headquarters; regimental aid post; and a headquarters company consisting of specialist signals, anti-aircraft, mortar, carrier, pioneer and administrative platoons. In August Moten attended a tactical exercise without troops at Puckapunyal in central Victoria, then went on a week's pre-embarkation leave at the end of September.

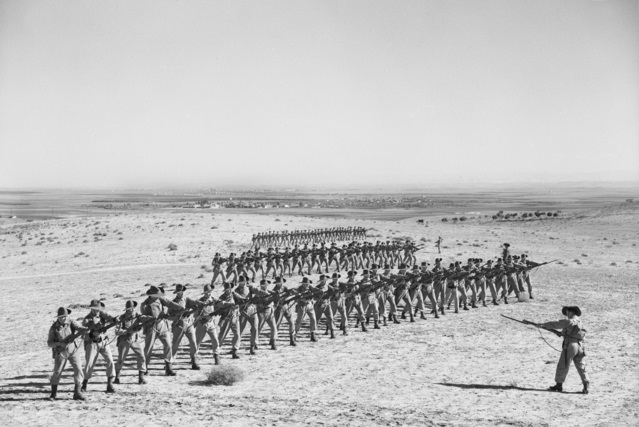
Troops of the 2/27th Battalion undergoing bayonet drills in Palestine in December 1940

=== Palestine and Egypt ===
The 2/27th Battalion entrained for Melbourne on 19 October and embarked there two days later aboard the requisitioned ocean liner Mauretania. Sailing via British India, the 2/27th briefly made camp at Deolali outside of Bombay for a week before embarking on the Takliwa for the rest of the voyage to the Middle East. The battalion arrived in Egypt on 24 November, disembarking at Kantara on the Suez Canal then moving to Julius Camp in Palestine for further training. With this task completed, the unit moved with the rest of the 7th Division to the Western Desert fortresses at Mersa Matruh and nearby Maaten Bagush in April 1941. Their role was to bolster the Libyan-Egyptian border defences against an anticipated German attack. The battalion did not experience direct ground combat during this period, but came under frequent air attack from Axis aircraft, improved their physical fitness, and gained useful experience in a war zone. On 22 May, the battalion began moving back to Palestine in preparation for the invasion of Syria and Lebanon. The main body of the unit crossed the Suez Canal at Kantara on 26 May, and reached its assembly area at Kfar Yehezkel in northern Palestine two days later.

=== Syria-Lebanon campaign ===
Brigadier Jack Stevens's 21st Brigade was given the task of advancing north up the 40 km (25 mi)-wide coastal route, and was split into two columns. Moten's column, consisting of the 2/27th Battalion and some light tanks, supported by artillery and engineers and with naval gunfire support, was given the task of clearing the coastal road after the 2/14th Battalion had captured the border posts, while a similar column based on the 2/16th Battalion advanced up the more difficult inland road. A subsidiary column formed by the British Cheshire Yeomanry horsed cavalry regiment would provide eastern flank protection to Moten's column and assist if his column was held up at the Litani River.

==== Initial operations and capture of Innsariye ====
The invasion began in the early hours of 8 June but Stevens decided not to push Moten's fully motorised column through the 2/14th Battalion, but instead kept that unit moving forward to establish if the French had cratered the road or demolished bridges that would stop the 2/27th from advancing. By the end of the first day, the 2/14th Battalion had occupied the town of Tyre. The 2/27th began moving forward on 9 June once a large crater in the road at Iskandaroun had been filled by engineers. In heavy fighting, the 2/16th crossed the Litani by boat on 9 June, and that evening, supported by a company of the 2/27th Battalion, they began clearing the opposite bank. During this fighting, the detached company of the 2/27th captured an entire company of Algerian colonial troops. That night the river was bridged by the engineers using pontoons, and the rest of the 2/27th began crossing in their vehicles on the morning of 10 June.

On 10 June the 2/27th advanced along the coast road led by a squadron of cavalry mounted in carriers, while the 2/16th cleared the high ground to the east. The cavalry pushed on through sporadic resistance past Kafr Badda, but both infantry battalions met opposition among the hills east of the road, and suffered casualties. Stevens, seeking to keep the French off-balance, ordered Moten to attack the French positions at Innsariye at midnight, which he did after a 30 minute artillery barrage with two companies leading. These met heavy resistance, and were also delayed while some enemy tanks were dispersed by the artillery, so a third company was swung around the leading companies on the right flank and pushed towards the battalion's final objective. Moten, who was forward with the third company, saw an opportunity to encircle the French still resisting the leading companies, and ordered the third company to take up a position on high ground overlooking a road running east from the French positions towards Es Sakiye, with his headquarters and the pioneer platoon deployed onto high ground above the coastal road to block that line of withdrawal for the French. The French surrendered at dawn on 11 June. The 2/14th Battalion then led the advance until the following day, when the 2/27th again took up the role.

At this stage the advance was held up by the French north of Khan Saada, where they had established defensive positions in the Wadi Zaharani, which dominated the intersection with the road running east towards Merdjayoun. A frontal attack by the 2/14th aimed at cutting this road had been unsuccessful. Moten reconnoitered to the east of the French position, guided by the adjutant of the 2/14th. He then sent two companies forward, and their successful attack secured the bridge across the Zaharani River and captured about 200 French prisoners. The 2/27th continued to push forward along the coast road, with lead elements reaching the village of Rhaziye where they were stopped by heavy artillery fire. Two companies of the battalion managed to advance to the village of Darb es Sim near Ghazieh during the night of 12/13 June.

==== Capture of Sidon ====
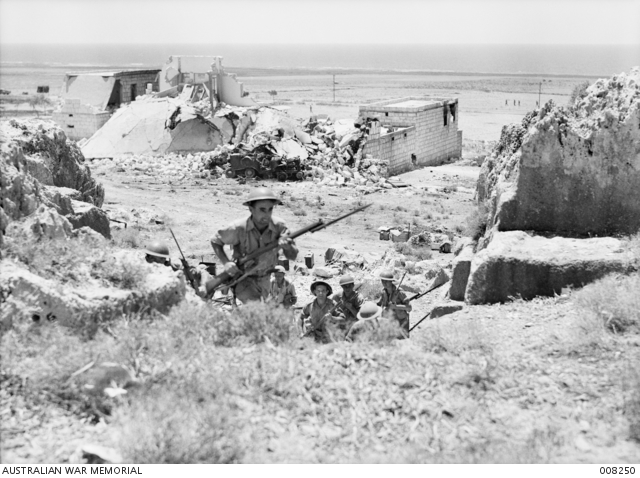
Troops of the 2/27th Battalion advancing on 13 June 1941

The task of capturing the key city of Sidon was initially given to the 2/16th Battalion, with the 2/27th companies at Darb es Sim to guard the approaches to Sidon from the east, although the orders to do so had not reached them. On 12 June, Moten had made an assessment that the best way to capture Sidon was not to attack frontally as the 2/16th was ordered to do by Stevens, but to push through the hills to the village of Miye ou Miye, 5 km (3.1 mi) east of Sidon, then attack Sidon from the flank. By the morning of 13 June, Moten's forward companies were on the southern bank of the Sataniq River, but he was unable to communicate with them in the rough terrain. He sent a patrol to locate them, and Stevens then ordered the rest of the 2/27th to join them and attack Sidon in accordance with Moten's appreciation of the best way to capture the city. All members of the battalion were very weary after five days of constant advancing and fighting, and when the trailing companies reached the lead ones before dawn on 14 June, they relieved them so they could prepare for the attack. After a gruelling cross-country march to the start line, the attack was met with significant resistance. On the same day the 2/14th was counter-attacked by a strong French force supported by tanks, but this was stopped with the assistance of the artillery. Acting on information from his advanced companies that Miye ou Miye had been abandoned, on the morning of 15 June Moten pushed his troops forward to the village and met no opposition. The 2/27th advanced to the outskirts of Sidon and a patrol was sent into the town which discovered that the French had withdrawn. Moten and his headquarters entered the city shortly afterwards, then Moten commandeered a taxi to report to Stevens who entered the city at 16:00.

==== French counter-attacks ====
Initially successful French counter-attacks on the inland column around Merdjayoun resulted in Stevens being ordered on 17 June to hold any further advance and send the 2/14th Battalion to reinforce Australian troops at Jezzine. Stevens requested a replacement, and was allocated a British unit, the 2nd Battalion, King's Own Royal Regiment (Lancaster), transferred from the British 16th Infantry Brigade. Despite the halt until the situation at Merdjayoun was resolved, the 21st Brigade pushed forward strong cavalry patrols and on 19 June the 2/16th captured the village of Jadra north of the Wadi Zeini. The 2/27th followed up and took up positions in the El Ouardaniye—Sebline-Kafr Maya area that afternoon. On 21 June Moten sent patrols to Sebline and Kafr Maya, and for the next few days the battalion picqueted the lateral roads and tracks further south protecting the eastern flank of the coastal column. On 25 June, Stevens sent the 2/27th and 2/16th forward to the El Haram ridgeline, and ordered Moten, who was to hold the right-hand position on the ridge, to send patrols towards Er Rezaniy. In the meantime, the 2/25th Battalion, supported by two companies of the 2/2nd Pioneer Battalion, was tasked to clear the French from the area between the two columns. At dawn on 26 June, the 2/27th and 2/16th secured the ridge against minimal French resistance.

On 28 June, the 7th Division, reinforced by the Australian 17th Brigade, was concentrated on the zones along the coast and north of Jezzine, leaving operations further east to the British 6th Division. This meant that Stevens' command was again reduced to two battalions, the 2/27th and 2/16th. He requested an additional battalion to sustain operations against the town of Damour on the road to Beirut, but this was not immediately forthcoming. He kept his units back from the Damour River to limit casualties from French artillery, but ordered his two battalions to patrol forward aggressively. On 29 June, Moten took his intelligence sergeant on a long reconnaissance of his right flank and identified a French position on a height known as Hill 394 which overlooked the Damour River. He tasked his nearest company commander to send a strong fighting patrol to the feature that night, and it was captured after brief resistance. A platoon-strength defensive position and observation post was established on the heights. Despite heavy French shelling over four hours, the platoon stayed in position. Stevens wanted to avoid another frontal attack, so Moten sent patrols forward to reconnoitre French positions and river crossing points on the right flank. Once these had been located, and similar reconnaissance of the crossings and French positions had been conducted by the 2/16th on the left, Stevens was allocated the 2/2nd Pioneer Battalion, but it only had two companies at this point. On 1 July, the 2/14th Battalion returned to the 21st Brigade from fighting around Jezzine as part of the 25th Brigade. All three infantry battalions were significantly under-strength due to casualties.

==== Capture of Damour and armistice ====
For the capture of Damour, the 2/27th was to conduct a single company preliminary operation to destroy French positions on a spur west of the village of El Mourhira, then after that company was relieved by two companies of the 2/14th Battalion, the 2/27th would cross the Damour River to El Boum and Four-à-Chaux and turn the French flank. Significant artillery support was to be provided for the brigade attack. The lead company of the 2/27th moved off from El Haram at dusk on 5 June, and marched cross-country to El Batal where they rested for three hours. A little after midnight they set off again, crossed the Damour at a point identified during the earlier reconnaissance, and climbed up a goat track to El Boum. Fixing bayonets around dawn, the lead platoon stormed the village to find it empty, with a few French troops fleeing in the distance. The next company suffered casualties among key personnel and was scattered by artillery fire, but the third company swapped objectives with it. The lead company was held up by an enemy position, but the arrival of the third company bolstered the assault and the position surrendered. The rest of the battalion pushed on and achieved its objectives. A platoon was posted on a feature known as Hill 512 which overlooked the village of Daraya. After 24 hours of hard marching and climbing, along with some fighting, including steep ascents of 240 m (800 ft) and then 300 m (1,000 ft), the battalion had secured the corridor through which the 17th Brigade was to pass then attack, cutting the road leading north out of Damour towards Beirut. Ultimately, Stevens pushed the 2/14th Battalion, less the two companies at El Mourhira, through the corridor to secure the start line for the 17th Brigade attack, and the 17th Brigade followed. The most advanced company of the 2/27th reached the eastern outskirts of Damour and sent two platoons into the town where they had several sharp exchanges of fire with French troops and captured more than their own number. Attacks from the south prompted the French to withdraw, and the town was secured by the morning of 9 July.

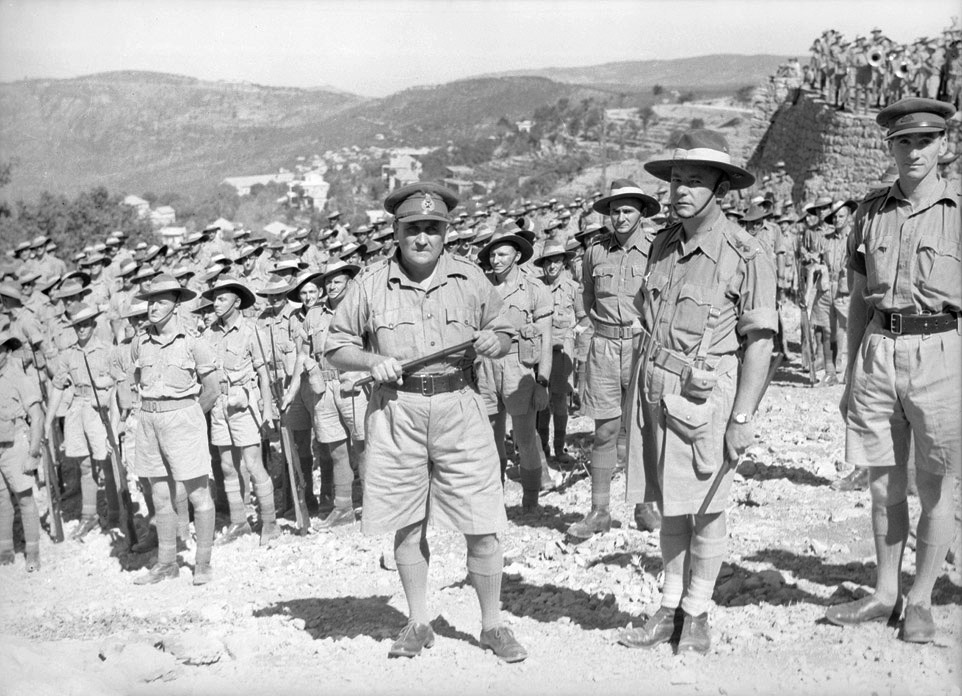
Moten (centre right) and his men were visited by the commander of the 7th Division, Major General Arthur "Tubby" Allen, at Hammana, Lebanon, on 2 September 1941

It soon became apparent that the French had withdrawn a considerable distance on all fronts of the campaign, and Stevens was ordered secure the villages of Abey and Kafra Matta overlooking Damour. Moten sent out a patrol that found the villages empty of French troops, which were then occupied by the 2/14th. The French commander had been considering capitulation for a couple of weeks at this stage, and a message had been sent to him by the commander of the Australian I Corps, Lieutenant General John Lavarack, as early as 30 June urging him to negotiate. A ceasefire came into force at 00:01 on 12 July. The 2/27th had suffered over 150 casualties during the campaign. Following the surrender of Vichy forces, the 2/27th undertook garrison duties around Hammana, near Beirut, and Bakhaoun in the Tripoli sector, as part of the Allied occupation force. In October, Moten spent two weeks in hospital with measles.

==== Brigade command and awards ====
Moten was promoted to colonel and temporary brigadier on 27 December and left the 2/27th to be immediately appointed as the commander of the 17th Brigade, part of the 6th Division. He "quietly and efficiently" took over the brigade from Stanley Savige, who had been appointed Director of Recruiting and Propaganda in Australia. The principal fighting units of the 17th Brigade were the 2/5th, 2/6th and 2/7th Battalions. When Moten took command, the 17th Brigade was training and re-equipping in Syria with the rest of the 6th Division after the disastrous Greek campaign. On 12 February 1942 Moten was mentioned in despatches for distinguished services in the Middle East and made a Companion of the Distinguished Service Order (DSO) for "excellent leadership and gallantry in the capture of Sidon". The citation for the DSO read:

To effect the capture of Saida [Sidon] in the face of a well organized and determined defence which blocked any progress along the Coast Road it was necessary to turn the position from the right flank. On 13 Jun., therefore, Lt.-Col. M. J. Moten was ordered to take his Bn. into high ground and capture Mey Ouimye. The terrain over which the Bn. was forced to move was extremely difficult and during the move fwd. it was dive-bombed and machine-gunned from the air and came under Arty. fire. Due to Lt.-Col. Moten's driving force and initiative the posn. was captured on 14 Jun. and the Bn. taken fwd. into such a posn. as to force the abandonment of the Saida defences. On the morning of 15 Jun. Col. Moten perceived that the Saida garrison had apparently withdrawn and immediately sent a patrol into the town. Throughout these two days his example, initiative and leadership contributed very largely to the abandonment of the Saida defences. This officer also showed excellent leadership skills, gallantry and devotion to duty at Battle of Damour.

— The London Gazette 12 February 1942

=== Ceylon ===
In early January 1942, it was agreed between the British and Australian governments that the 6th Division would be withdrawn from Syria and move to the Far East in response to the entry of Japan into the war. In late January and early February, the Australian government agreed to the deployment of the 6th Division to Java to oppose the Japanese southward thrust. These plans were soon changed when it was decided that two brigades should be diverted to defend Ceylon (modern-day Sri Lanka), and the 16th and 17th Brigades were chosen for this task. Moten embarked from the Middle East with his headquarters on 10 March and disembarked at Colombo on 24 March.

The Second AIF force in Ceylon was commanded by Major General Allan Boase, on promotion from commanding the 16th Brigade. The force was responsible for the southwest corner of Ceylon, the area considered most likely for a Japanese landing. The areas not covered by coconut, rubber and tea plantations consisted of thick bush or rice paddies. As future fighting would be vastly different from what they had experienced, Moten established a Jungle Warfare School to prepare his troops. The Australians were also involved in improving the weak transport infrastructure. Japanese carrier-borne aircraft attacked Ceylon on both 5 and 9 April, and sank several British and Australian ships operating in the region. The 17th Brigade was stationed around Akuressa. About this time, the newly appointed commander-in-chief, Australian Military Forces, General Sir Thomas Blamey, decided that the brigades in Ceylon would return to Australia. The 17th Brigade headquarters commenced its voyage back to Australia aboard the Athlone Castle in July, and arrived in Melbourne on 4 August.

=== Papua and New Guinea ===
The brigade went into camp near Seymour, Victoria, and after a brief period of leave, on 28 August a welcome home parade was held in Melbourne for the brigade. On the same day, Moten received a warning order for a brigade move to New South Wales. Due to railway congestion and equipment deficiencies, the move to Greta in the Hunter Valley was not completed until 20 September. During the move, Moten visited Melbourne and was permitted to read a confidential report on the fighting on the Kokoda Trail in New Guinea written by the war correspondent Chester Wilmot. The brigade had barely consolidated at Greta and conducted an initial training exercise before it was ordered to Brisbane in Queensland. By 6 October the brigade was consolidated in the northern suburbs of Brisbane, but its stay there was brief as it embarked two days later. Moten flew to Townsville in north Queensland, then on to Cairns then Port Moresby in the Territory of New Guinea on 12 October. The following day he flew to Milne Bay in the Territory of Papua, where the brigade was now heading.

Despite the resounding Allied victory in the Battle of Milne Bay in August and September, and the need to deploy the whole 18th Brigade elsewhere, the Allied commanders were not willing to weaken the defences of the strategically-important base at Milne Bay. The 17th Brigade was therefore directed there to relieve the remaining battalion of the 18th Brigade, which was part of Major General Cyril Clowes' Milne Force, redesignated the 11th Division on 1 October. The advance party of the brigade arrived in mid-October and the battalions arrived soon afterwards. There was little Japanese activity in the area, so the brigade was not involved in any significant fighting at Milne Bay. There was a significant spike in malaria infections in the area during the time the 17th Brigade was part of the garrison, peaking at over 80 cases per 1,000 men per week around Christmas 1942. This was due to a combination of the disease being endemic in the area, poor anti-malarial supervision by officers of fighting units, and inadequate anti-malarial supplies. Moten administered command of the 11th Division from 29 December until he flew to Wau in the New Guinea on 9 January 1943 to conduct a reconnaissance for a planned brigade deployment to the area. The 29th Brigade arrived to relive the 17th Brigade, and brigade units began departing by sea for Port Moresby on 10 January.

==== Defence of Wau ====
An ad hoc Australian formation known as Kanga Force had been monitoring and harassing the Japanese bases at Lae and Salamaua since early 1942. By the time Moten arrived in Wau, the core of the force consisted of the 2/5th and 2/7th Independent Companies, irregular units trained for long-range patrol and surveillance. In early January, a Japanese troop convoy sailed from Rabaul to Lae with reinforcements, and despite interdiction by Allied air attacks, successfully landed most of the troops on 7 January 1943. In response, Kanga Force launched a successful attack on the Japanese advanced position at Mubo and withdrew under Japanese pressure. The arrival of the Japanese reinforcements at Lae prompted the Allied decision to send the 17th Brigade to Wau to bolster Kanga Force ahead of an expected Japanese advance on Wau. Moten returned to Port Moresby on 14 January and the following day he received written orders that he was to take over defences at Wau and command of Kanga Force.

On 14 January, the first fighting elements of the 17th Brigade began arriving in Wau by air, led by B Company of the 2/6th Battalion and the advanced brigade headquarters. B Company was immediately pushed forward to support the independent companies while the bulk of the 2/6th had arrived in Wau by 19 January and another company was quickly placed astride another track leading from Lae to Wau. The air transport of the brigade was hampered by poor flying weather and accidents, and it took much of the following week for the rest of the brigade to concentrate in Wau. Moten's aircraft turned back on 15 January, and he did not reach Wau until the following day. He was scathing about the air transport arrangements, saying that they were "uneconomical and haphazard". By 19 January significant elements of the 2/6th were effectively deployed on the tracks leading towards Wau.

On 21 January, a patrol from the 2/6th observed Japanese troops moving forward, but the enemy axis of advance was not clear. The last of the 2/6th arrived in Wau on 23 January, and the following day the lead elements of the 2/5th Battalion and some engineers flew in. Moten intensified patrolling to establish the Japanese main advance, and by 26 January had determined that they were using an old disused track labelled the "Jap Track". He decided that, despite a lack of reserves in Wau due to the slow buildup, he would attack the advancing Japanese from the forward positions of the 2/6th on the Black Cat Track. An aggressive enemy advance up the "Jap Track" completely derailed this plan, and Moten responded with piecemeal defensive deployments as troops arrived in Wau, including forward positions south east of Wau near Leahy's Farm. By late on 28 January, the rest of the 2/5th had not been able to get to Wau, and the 2/7th Battalion was also stuck on the ground in Port Moresby. Moten called most of his forward elements to withdraw to Wau and deployed them in close defence of the village and airfield. Finally on the morning of 29 January the weather broke enough for the rest of the 2/5th and the main body of the 2/7th Battalion to arrive. They were rushed into defensive positions around the airfield.

Before dawn on 30 January the Japanese assault on the airfield began, beginning from the south east. Moten's positions held, and by mid-morning he considered that with the arrival of two guns of the 2/1st Field Regiment on aircraft earlier that morning he could take the initiative using a company of the 2/7th to forestall a Japanese flanking manoeuvre to the south of Leahy's Farm, leaving the remainder of the force to protect the airfield. This move, supported by strafing by Royal Australian Air Force Bristol Beaufighters, caused significant enemy casualties and stopped the Japanese in their tracks. The following day the 2/3rd Independent Company and 100 reinforcements for the 2/6th Battalion arrived to further bolster Kanga Force. More reinforcements arrived on 1 February, bringing Kanga Force strength to 201 officers and 2,965 men. By nightfall on 3 February, the Wau defences were holding well, another company of the 2/7th had been pushed forward south of Leahy's Farm to block further Japanese advances, and their assaults were clearly weakening. That evening Moten signalled New Guinea Force that Wau was secure.

Moten then committed the 2/5th Battalion to offensive action, and in hard fighting up to 9 February they cleared the area west of the Bulolo River, killing hundreds of Japanese and putting the rest to flight. This effectively destroyed Japanese strength in the Wau Valley. After consolidation, Moten rested part of the 2/5th and pushed the three platoons of the 2/3rd Independent Company along the three tracks leading towards Mubo. On the northern Black Cat Track, elements of the 2/6th largely held off a Japanese counter-attack on 10 February. Moten held them there rather than withdrawing them to Wau to rest, as the overall situation remained unclear. They were relieved by a 2/3rd Independent Company platoon on 15 February. The Japanese fell back in an orderly fashion towards Mubo, harassed by aircraft and patrols. On 26 February, an attack by the 2/5th Battalion and 2/7th Independent Company from the Australian right flank to clear the Japanese staging areas around Buibaining met with almost no opposition. By the end of the month Moten's force had driven the Japanese back to Mubo. During the advance to Wau and retreat to Mubo, the main Japanese fighting force, the 102nd Infantry Regiment, had likely suffered around 1,200 killed, as well as some who had died of starvation.

In early March, Moten was recommended by the General Officer Commanding New Guinea Force, Lieutenant General Sir Iven Mackay, for an immediate award of a bar to the DSO he had been awarded for his performance in the Syria-Lebanon campaign. The recommendation was supported by Blamey. On 18 May 1943, Moten was awarded the bar to his DSO for "a high order of leadership and control" during the Battle of Wau. The citation for the DSO read:

Brigadier MOTEN, D.S.O., E.D. commanded 17 Aust. Inf. Bde. Group which successfully defeated the strong Japanese attack on WAU, between Jan 27 and Feb 20, 1943. From captured orders, it is known that the Japanese attack was made by 102 Regtl. Grp, of which two Infantry Battalions, augmented by the personnel of one Artillery Battery and one Engineer Company were forward, the Third Infantry Battalion being in reserve. When the Japanese attack suddenly developed at WANDUMI on Jan. 27, Brigadier MOTEN had with him only half of 17 Inf. Bde. personnel and no Artillery. On Jan 30. the enemy made a heavy attack and came within 400 yards of WAU airfield. This effort was, however, repelled by the infantry with its light weapons and 350 casualties inflicted on the Japanese. After the arrival of reinforcements on Jan 30-31, Brigadier MOTEN further defeated the enemy and proceeded to drive him back, eventually, by Feb. 20, forcing him back to WAIPALI-GAUDAGSAL AREA, more than 20 miles from WAU. It is estimated that the Japanese casualties in the whole operation were not less than 1200. Under critical circumstances Brigadier MOTEN showed a high order of leadership and control.

==== Salamaua–Lae campaign ====
In early March Moten reminded his forward troops, the 2/7th Independent Company supported by the 2/5th Battalion, to maintain close contact with the Japanese. This they did via aggressive patrolling, and by the end of March were closed up on Mubo itself. In early April Moten sent the 2/7th Battalion to relieve the forward troops. Moten had decided that the main threat to Wau was now from the area of the Markham Valley. He deployed the 2/6th Battalion to cover those approaches, the 2/7th remained opposite Mubo, and the 2/3rd Independent Company was positioned in the Missim area. By this time, the 2/5th and 2/7th Independent Companies were being withdrawn, and the lead battalion of the 15th Brigade, the 24th, was arriving. Throughout April, Moten's force continued to patrol the approaches to Mubo. The terrain and weather were some of the most unpleasant faced by Australian troops during the war. Rugged mountains, almost impenetrable jungle, kunai grass, gloom and rain were the rule for much of the time. Moten established rest camps where his troops could sleep in dry conditions, have a few hot meals, and wash themselves and their uniforms. These were positioned rear of the forward positions, and one was established at Edie Creek. Such rest camps helped reduce the depression and illness that went hand-in-hand with the terrible conditions.

On 23 April, Kanga Force was dissolved and the headquarters of Major General Stanley Savige's 3rd Division opened at Bulolo, taking command of Moten's brigade. An abortive company attack on a Japanese-held feature called "The Pimple" by the 2/7th Battalion on 24 and 25 April showed that extensive reconnaissance, improved communication and pinpoint accuracy from supporting aircraft and artillery were required for such limited offensive actions to be successful. Savige's initial directions to Moten were that the 17th Brigade was to prevent the Japanese from entering the Bulolo Valley from the Mubo area, secure the Mubo-Guadagasal-Waipali area, and gain control of the coastal area immediate south of the Bitoli River. Moten's concern about his left flank meant that he retained the 2/5th Battalion at Wau to patrol along the two tracks from Waipali, the "Jap Track" and "Black Cat Track". At this point Moten believed the best location for his headquarters remained at Wau, but Savige disagreed and urged him forward. A further attempt on "The Pimple" by a company of the 2/7th Battalion on 2 May was also a failure, although the air support improved. This decided Savige on a policy of not attacking prepared defensive positions, but instead to use aggressive patrolling and minor limited attacks to outflank, neutralise and isolate the Japanese defenders. Despite this, on 7 May the 2/7th mounted yet another fruitless attack on "The Pimple". Total casualties for the 2/7th Battalion from the three attacks amounted to 12 killed and 25 wounded. Two days later a company of the 2/7th Battalion was surrounded by a Japanese attack and the relieving force had to fight through to them with some difficulty over the following two days. After a frank exchange of views between Savige and Moten regarding the location of Moten's headquarters, Savige clarified that Moten was not responsible for the defence of the Wau Valley itself, but only to prevent entry into the valley from Mubo, and Moten moved his headquarters forward to Skindewai. Despite their differences, Savige and Moten continued to work well together.

On 12 May, Moten revised his plan based on his expectation that the Japanese would remain on a defensive footing around Salamaua and Mubo, and decided he would continue to use only one battalion forward, with a company securing the coast south from the Bitoli River to Nassau Bay through raiding. The 2/7th Battalion remained forward, with a company of the 2/6th attached for the coastal task, and the rest of the brigade would be held in reserve. Both Savige and Moten were concerned about the southern or right flank around Nassau Bay and Duali. Moten concentrated on aggressive patrolling, and soon this had restricted the Japanese to their defensive positions. Towards the end of May, Moten brought the 2/6th Battalion up to relieve the 2/7th Battalion in the brigade forward area. By the first week in June, the 2/6th was deployed with companies on: Lababia Ridge – with a platoon at Napier; at Mat Mat; at Summit; and at the Saddle. The 2/5th and 2/7th Battalions were located in and around Wau. Moten was unhappy with the position of the 2/6th Battalion company at Lababia Ridge, and ordered adjustments so that Japanese activity near the Pimple would be easier to detect. At the same time, Moten was tasked with assisting the landing of a US battalion at Nassau Bay followed by an attack on Mubo as part of an upcoming offensive, and he tasked reconnaissance patrols to Nassau Bay. Moten was tasked with coordinating the landing and then, taking the US battalion under command, capturing Mubo. On 15 June Moten briefed senior commanders – including the commander of New Guinea Force, Lieutenant General Sir Edmund Herring, and the Deputy Chief of the General Staff, Major General Frank Berryman, on his five-phase plan for the operation, and Herring expressed his satisfaction with Moten's arrangements.

The 17th Brigade repulsed Japanese assaults at Mubo and Lababia Ridge and following the capture of Komiatum and Mount Tambu in August, Moten was appointed Commander of the Order of the British Empire and again mentioned in despatches. The 17th Brigade returned to Australia for rest and regrouping and later returned to New Guinea for the Aitape–Wewak campaign. Moten took command of the 6th Division from 18 November 1945.

== Later life ==
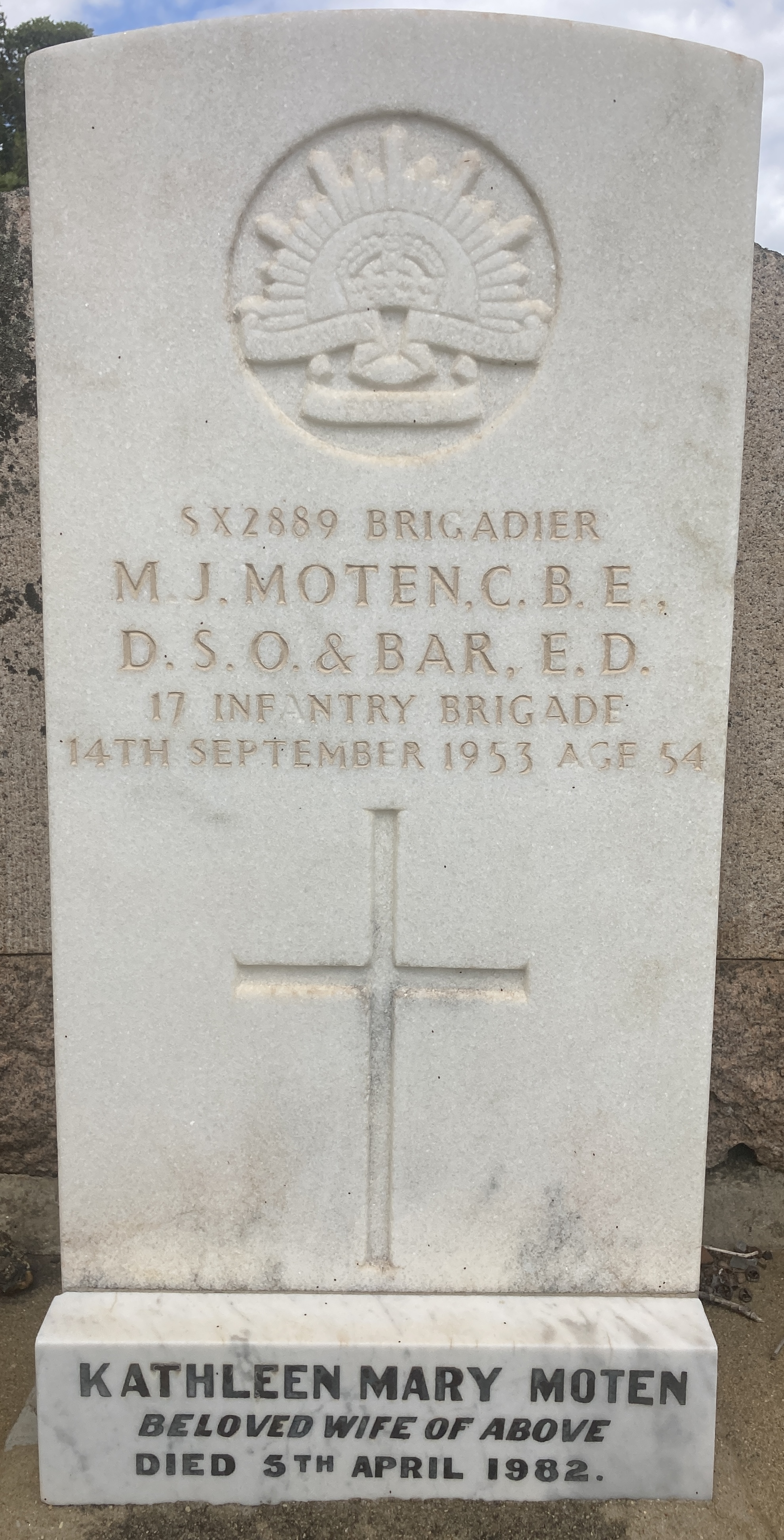
Moten's grave at Centennial Park Cemetery

After returning to Australia, Moten was transferred to the Regimental Supernumerary List on 17 January 1946 in Adelaide and he resumed his civilian career. He led the Australian army component of the Victory March in London in June. Moten became the Australian Army Representative of the Imperial War Graves Commission in 1947, and went on to command the 9th Brigade of the CMF and while serving in this capacity he was appointed honorary colonel of the 27th Battalion of the CMF in 1952. He was promoted as the general manager of the Savings Bank of South Australia in December. He was appointed as an aide de camp to the Governor-General of Australia on 16 March 1953.

Moten collapsed at the 27th Battalion ball at the Torrens Drill Hall on 5 September 1953 and on 14 September, while in the Royal Adelaide Hospital, he died of a heart attack. He was buried with full military honours in Centennial Park Cemetery with Anglican and Catholic rites. He was survived by his wife, daughter and two sons. His son, John Moten, was Director-General of Security (the head of the Australian Security Intelligence Organisation) from 1988 to 1991.
