= Wau Airport (Papua New Guinea) =

- IATA: WUG; ICAO: AYWU

Summary
- Serves: Wau, Papua New Guinea
- Location: Papua New Guinea
- Elevation AMSL: 3,475 ft / 1,059 m
- Coordinates: 07°20′43″S 146°43′08″E

Map
- Location in Papua New Guinea

Runways
Direction	Length		Surface
Direction	ft	m	Surface
	2,675	815

Wau Airport is an airport serving Wau in Papua New Guinea.

A grass runway was constructed in 1927 by Cecil Levien with the assistance of native labourers. The first landing at Wau was made on 19 April 1927 by Ernest Mustar in a De Havilland DH.37 owned by Guinea Gold Airways from Lae Airfield. The airfield was extended during the Second World War to 1500 x 100 x 4000 yards as described in 1942. Wau airfield was a rough Kunai grass airstrip 3,100 feet (940 m) in length with a 12% slope heading directly for Mount Kaindi. Aircraft could approach from the northeast only, landing uphill and taking off downhill. The mountain at the end of the runway prevented second attempts at landing and precluded extension of the strip. Pilots had to manoeuvre Dakotas under clouds and through dangerous passes, "dodging a peak here and cloud there", landing at high speeds. This required good visibility, but the weather over Owen Stanley Range was characterised by frequent storms, down drafts, and mists which rose from the jungle floor.

The Imperial Japanese Army sent 3,000 troops from Salamaua and Mubo along the Black Cat Track to seize Wau Airfield from the Australians. The Japanese force was known as the Okabe Detachment and was commanded by Major General Toru Okabe. The Japanese offensive was stopped by the Australian Army force known as Kanga Force in the battle of Wau.

A Royal Australian Air Force C-47 Dakota (#A65-92) crashed at the airfield on 22 October 1960 and was written off.
