= Tourism in Papua New Guinea =

Tourism in Papua New Guinea is a fledgling industry but there are attractions for the potential visitor which include culture, markets, festivals, diving, surfing, hiking, fishing and the unique flora and fauna. Papua New Guinea receives an increasing number of visitors each year, with approximately 184,000 international arrivals in 2015.

Tourist arrivals of 2023 in %

== History ==
In April 1883, James Burns and Robert Philp began a trading partnership, originally named the "Burns Philp & Company Limited". They were the first company to offer tourism to New Guinea, in 1884, advertising the 'New Guinea Excursion Trip'. This consisted of a five-week trip from Thursday Island and has been described as the "official beginning of tourist cruises in the South Pacific". The company later published a book titled Picturesque Travel.

By 1914 the Burns Philp Tourist Department was established advertising tours on Lord Howe and Norfolk Island. Acquisition of the Port Moresby Hotel occurred in the same year, with the Papua Hotel purchased some years later. Burns Philp "maintained a near monopoly on passenger services to Melanesia until the outbreak of the war in the Pacific". The war saw the British government take over some of the Burns Philp fleet and the vessel Macdui was sunk in Port Moresby in 1942 as its first voyage as a troop carrier.

== Attractions ==
=== Culture ===
The culture of Papua New Guinea is highly diverse, as implied by the existence of over 800 languages in the country. Styles of cultural expression – carving, dance, singing, ornamentation, architecture, and more – vary greatly across the nation.

=== Festivals ===
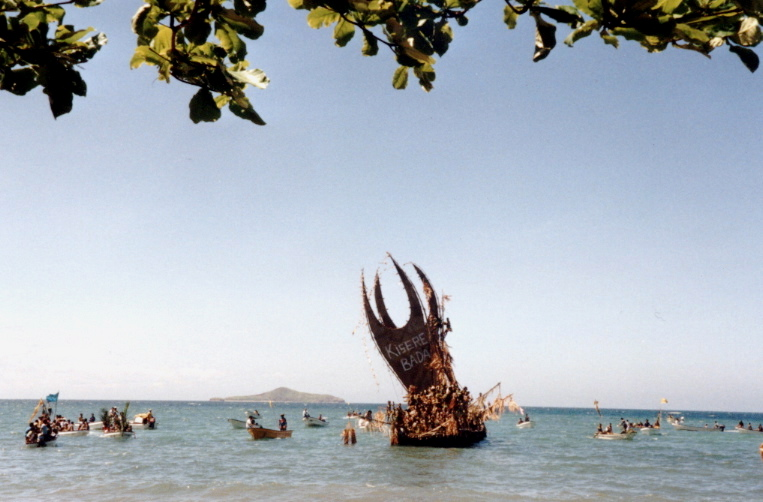
Hiri Moale Festival

Public festivals which are open to tourists include the Coffee Festival in Goroka – May, National Mask Festival in Rabaul-July, Mt Hagen Show – August, Goroka Show – September, Hiri Moale Festival in Port Moresby – September, Morobe Show in Lae – October, Kundu & Canoe Festival in Alotau – November.

=== Markets ===
The markets are a great drawcard for tourists. Along with local foods, arts and crafts are often on display and can be purchased for reasonable prices. Some of the items on display are traditional carvings and beadwork, traditional and contemporary paintings on canvas and traditionally woven baskets and serving trays. The larger more tourist oriented markets are usually held once a month in the larger towns.

=== Diving ===
PNG is arguably one of the best diving destinations in the world, having one of the healthiest coral reef systems on the planet. In addition to a large number of reef sites, there are also numerous wrecked World War II boats and aircraft, providing a wealth of Wreck Diving opportunities. Some of the best dive spots are at West New Britain (including Kimbe Bay), Kavieng, Madang, Alotau, Tufi and East New Britain (including Rabaul). The capital, Port Moresby, also offers superb diving.

Many of the diving spots are easily accessible by day trip boat, and there are many sites further out which can be dived from one of the many liveaboards offered locally.

=== Surfing ===
Surfing can be enjoyed all year round. The southern side of PNG includes places such as Hula Beach (100 km from Port Moresby), Milne Bay, Bougainville, and East New Britain which can be surfed from June through to September. In the north of PNG surfing season is mid October to late April. There are great surfing locations which include Madang, Wewak and Kavieng, with the better and more consistent waves found in Vanimo.

=== Hiking/Trekking ===
The most famous walking trail in Papua New Guinea is the Kokoda Track, the site of a famous World War II battle between Australia and Japan. Another popular hike is climbing Mount Wilhelm, the highest mountain in Papua New Guinea. There are many more walking tracks, including the very rough Bulldog and Black Cat Tracks.

== Security ==
Many countries have issued travel warnings to their citizens wishing to visit Papua New Guinea, due to its high level of violent crime, slow police response times and poor human rights record.

Foreign nationals in Papua New Guinea have become tempting targets to criminals, especially those visiting from wealthier countries are more likely to become victims of violence and crime. Lone foreign females are usually advised not to travel unescorted in Port Moresby and in parts of the Highlands region due to the high risks of unwanted harassment and sexual assault. Travelers are usually advised by their origin countries to seek up-to-date information about the current situation before traveling and to only travel with qualified and experienced tour operators with extensive knowledge of Papua New Guinea and its local customs. It is generally advised by travel boards to never travel alone or at night in Papua New Guinea.

LGBT travelers are usually advised to avoid traveling to Papua New Guinea entirely because homosexuality is criminalized and prohibited. Those caught engaging in anal sex can be sentenced with up to 14 years imprisonment. Other homosexual acts are punishable with up to 3 years imprisonment. Possession of pornographic material is also illegal.

The use of private security companies are available to hire for tourists in Papua New Guinea as well as other security protection services.

== Transport ==
Transport in Papua New Guinea is in many cases heavily limited by the mountainous terrain. The capital, Port Moresby, is not linked by road to any of the other major towns and many highland villages can only be reached by light aircraft or on foot.

== See also ==
- Visa policy of Papua New Guinea
