= Osmar White =

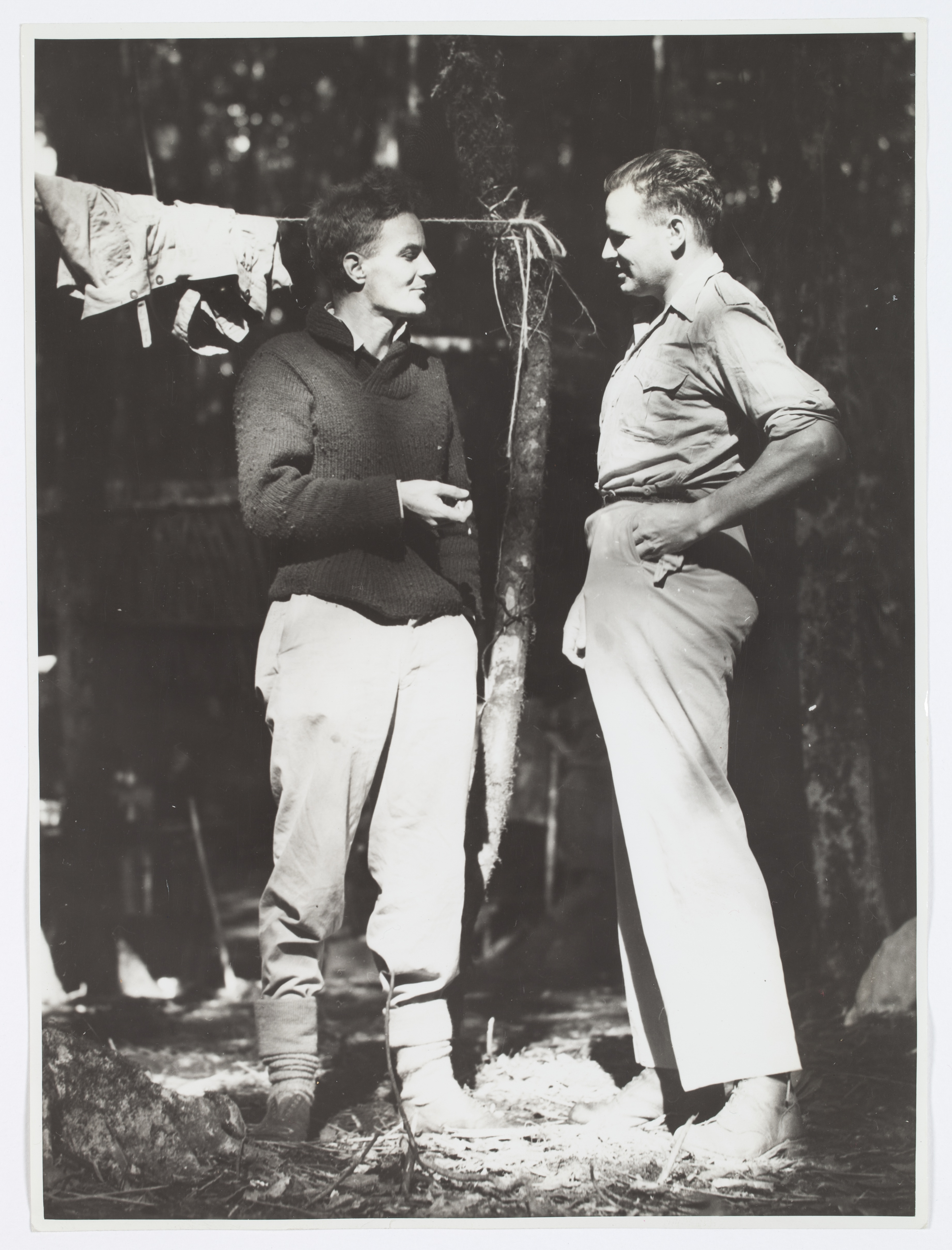
- War correspondents Osmar White (right) and Chester Wilmot, Kokoda camp, Papua New Guinea, 1941
- Born: Osmar Egmont Dorkin White; 2 April 1909; Feilding, New Zealand
- Died: 16 May 1991 (aged 82); Melbourne, Australia
- Other names: (pen names) - Robert Dentry, EM Dorkin, Maros Gray
- Occupations: Journalist, war correspondent, writer

Osmar Egmont Dorkin White (2 April 1909 – 16 May 1991) was an Australian journalist, war correspondent and writer. He is most famous for his vivid description of the New Guinea Campaign during World War II. He also wrote under the pseudonyms Robert Dentry, EM Dorkin, and Maros Gray.

== Early life ==
Born in Feilding, New Zealand, White moved with his family to Australia when he was five and spent his childhood in Katoomba.

== Professional background ==
White began his career as a journalist with the Cumberland Times in Parramatta, New South Wales, before moving to the Wagga Wagga Advertiser. He also wrote for the Sydney Daily Telegraph as a district correspondent while studying at the University of Sydney. From 1928 to 1933, he worked as a freelance writer in South and Southeast Asia and Papua New Guinea and published dozens of short stories in The Australian Journal, The Bulletin and magazines in the United Kingdom.

== World War II ==
White was a journalist with The Herald and Weekly Times during the Japanese invasion of Papua New Guinea in 1942, before becoming an accredited war correspondent with the Australian forces there. Together with Australian war photographer Damien Parer and war correspondent Chester Wilmot, White walked over the Bulldog Track to cover the guerrilla campaign conducted by Kanga Force and later also covered the Kokoda Track Campaign, detailing the trials and triumphs of Allied troops during that time. He was seriously wounded during the New Georgia campaign and, while recovering in Australia, he wrote Green Armour, which described in detail the harsh conditions of the jungle fighting in 1942 including on the Kokoda Track.

Herald and Weekly Times chairman Sir Keith Murdoch (father of future media magnate Rupert Murdoch), highly impressed by White's writing ability, promoted him to one of the Herald's top correspondent positions and sent him to Europe to cover the Western Front. White was one of the few Australian journalists attached to the Supreme Allied Command (SHAEF), and was present during the Allied liberation of Paris. He was later attached to General George Patton's Third Army, and followed it into Germany during the final days of the war in Europe. He was the only Australian journalist present at the German surrender at Reims, France, in 1945 and one of the first journalists to enter war-torn Berlin.

== Later life ==
After the war, White returned to Australia and the Melbourne Herald as a senior writer. In the early 1950s, he wrote a hard-hitting series that ran for over one year and called for radical reform of mental health and child welfare provisions in the State of Victoria. However, his main specialty was the Pacific and Southeast Asia, and Papua New Guinea, where he travelled extensively in the 1950s and early 1960s. He was the sole Australian press representative on the Australian Antarctic expedition of 1956-57. Following his retirement from daily journalism in 1963, he wrote a number of books, including a history of Papua New Guinea, a successful series of children's books, two novels, radio and television scripts and occasional contributions to various newspapers and magazines including Walkabout.

He died in Melbourne on 16 May 1991.

== Works ==
In addition to Green Armour, White's other major work was Conquerors' Road, which recounted his experience as a war correspondent in Europe. However, after having initially set publication dates, publishers in both the United States and England refused to publish the book. Although no reason was given at the time, White believed the work, which contained criticism of Allied forces behaviour at both the military and political levels, was too controversial. He was therefore obliged to shelve the book until the 1980s, when he re-edited it and attempted to have it published again. It was finally published posthumously by HarperCollins in 1996, and re-published by Cambridge University Press in 2003. It is a unique work in that it provides a first-hand account by an accredited war correspondent of the final days of Hitler's regime.

White wrote a novel, Silent Reach, which was adapted into a television mini-series in 1983.

- White, Osmar (1945). Green Armour. Australian War Classics series. Penguin. ISBN 0-14-014706-3.
- White, Osmar (1966). Parliament of a Thousand Tribes: a Study of New Guinea. Heinemann.
- White, Osmar (1967). Time Now, Time Before. Heinemann, Melbourne. (travels in the south-western Pacific)
- White, Osmar (1969). Under the Iron Rainbow: Northwest Australia Today. Heinemann, Melbourne.
- White, Osmar (1974). Australia for Everyone: a Modern Guide.
- White, Osmar (1978). Silent Reach. Charles Scribner, New York. (novel)
- White, Osmar (1996). Conquerors' Road. HarperCollins/Cambridge University Press. ISBN 0732256070.
