= Toru Okabe =

Japanese major general (1889–1961)

- 岡部 通
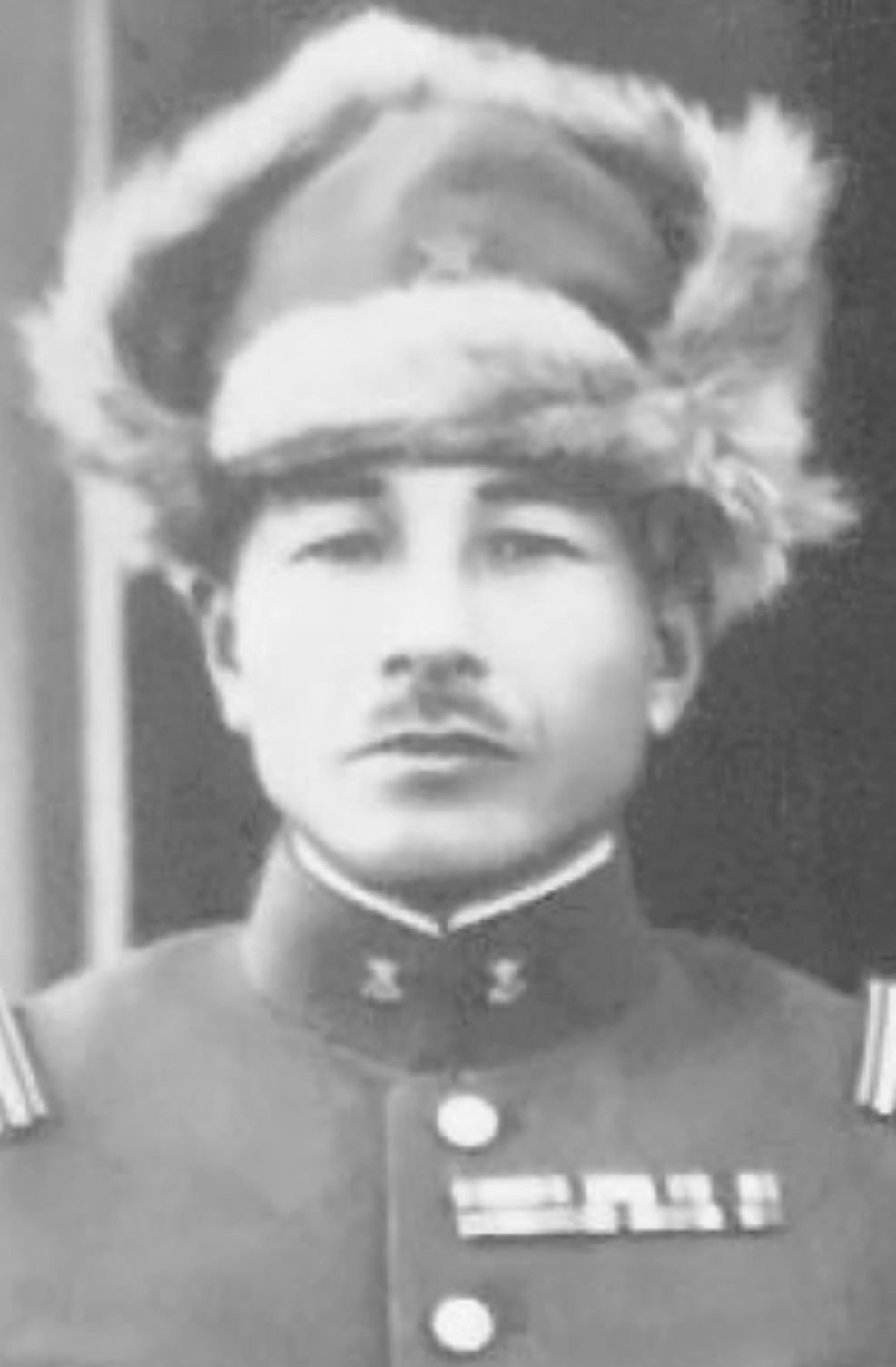
- Born: September 2, 1889; Tokyo, Japan
- Died: December 18, 1961 (aged 72)
- Military career
- Allegiance: Empire of Japan
- Branch: Imperial Japanese Army
- Rank: Major General
- Conflicts: Second Sino-Japanese War; Battle of Changsha; World War II; New Guinea campaign; Battle of Wau; Salamaua–Lae campaign

Toru Okabe (岡部 通, Okabe Tōru; September 2, 1889 – December 18, 1961) was a major general in the Imperial Japanese Army during World War II.

== Biography ==
Okabe was a native of Tokyo. He graduated from the 23rd class of the Imperial Japanese Army Academy and was commissioned as a second lieutenant in the infantry.

From March 1937 he was the commander of the 8th Independent Training Battalion, and was promoted to colonel in November of the same year. In March 1939, he was appointed commander of the Utsunomiya Regimental District, a recruiting and training unit responsible for raising troops in Tochigi Prefecture. Okabe was assigned command of then IJA 13th Infantry Regiment in October 1940, and was promoted to major general in August 1941. He led the regiment at the Battle of Changsha from September 18 to October 6, 1941 including after his promotion to commander of the IJA 51st Infantry Group. In July 1942, his forces were transferred to the command of the Japanese 17th Army and reassigned to the Solomon Islands, and subsequently to the Japanese 18th Army, where they went into combat during the Salamaua–Lae campaign. He led the "Okabe Detachment" along the Black Cat Track and at the Battle of Wau. In May 1943, he was rotated back to Japan and attached to the Eastern District Army, which was responsible for defense of Tokyo and its environs. In February 1944, he was appointed commander of the IJA 32nd Security Unit based in Hokkaido. In March 1945, he was made commander of the IJA 79th Independent Mixed Brigade, which was sent to Andong in southern Manchukuo, where he remained until the surrender of Japan.

He was assigned as the Commanding Officer of the 32 Defense Unit in 1944, until being appointed as the Commanding Officer of the 79th Independent Mixed Brigade in 1945.
