= 2/1st Field Regiment (Australia) =

Australian Army artillery regiment

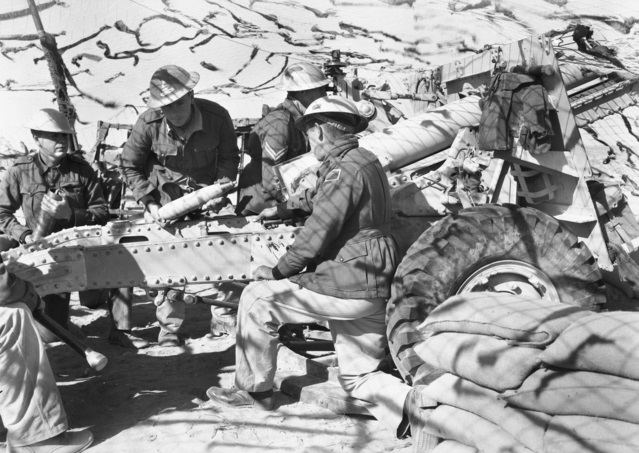
- Gunners from the 2/1st at Bardia
- Active: 1939–1945
- Country: Australia
- Branch: Australian Military Forces
- Type: Regiment
- Role: Artillery
- Part of: 6th Division
- Engagements: World War II: North African campaign; Battle of Greece; Kokoda Track campaign; Battle of Buna–Gona; Battle of Wau; Aitape–Wewak campaign

The 2/1st Field Regiment was an Australian Army artillery regiment raised as part of the all volunteer Second Australian Imperial Force during World War II. Formed in October 1939, the regiment was assigned to the 6th Division. Shortly after it was raised, the regiment was deployed to the Middle East, where it was briefly re-roled as an anti-aircraft regiment before returning to the field artillery role. In 1941, the regiment served in North Africa and in Greece, before being withdrawn back to Australia in early 1942, following Japan's entry into the war. In late 1942, and early 1943, the regiment took part in the defence of Port Moresby during the fighting along the Kokoda Track, before taking part in the Battle of Buna–Gona and the defence of Wau, remaining in New Guinea on garrison duties until August 1943. Withdrawn to Australia, a long period of training followed before the regiment took part in its final campaign of the war Aitape–Wewak campaign in 1945.

== History ==
The 2/1st Field Regiment was raised in October 1940, as part of the all volunteer Second Australian Imperial Force (2nd AIF). Assigned to the 6th Division, its headquarters opened at Ingleburn, New South Wales, and the majority of its personnel were recruited from New South Wales. At the outset, the regiment consisted of two batteries, designated as the 1st and 2nd Batteries. After training in Australia, the regiment embarked for the Middle East in January 1940, arriving in Palestine the following month. After several months, part of the regiment's personnel – the regimental headquarters and the 1st Battery – were used to form an anti-aircraft (AA) regiment, designated as "Y Anti-Aircraft Regiment", along with elements of the 2/4th Infantry Battalion, to provide light air defence around Haifa. Later, the infantrymen returned to their battalion and the regiment was redesignated as the "2/1st Field Regiment (Anti-Aircraft)", with three AA batteries designated "A", "B" and "C". These batteries were sent to Egypt and occupied Aboukir, Sidi Bisr, Port Fuad and Helwan.

At Helwan, in September 1940, the regiment was re-roled once again as a field regiment, and re-equipped. The following month, the 6th Division began large scale exercises in preparation for its commitment to the Western Desert campaign. In January 1941, the Australians went into action against the Italians for the first time, attacking Bardia. The 2/1st supported the 16th Brigade at this time, before switching to support the 19th Brigade's advance towards Tobruk. The regiment's headquarters then assumed control of a number of Australian and British artillery units as they pushed towards Derna, Barce and then Benghazi.

Following this, the 6th Division was deployed to Greece to defend against a German invasion. The regiment deployed in support, but the 2nd Battery remained in Egypt. By the time the regiment arrived, the invasion had begun and Allied forces were already in retreat; several rearguard actions were fought as they withdrew from Domokos towards Kalamata. The regiment's personnel were evacuated, but they lost most of their guns. The regiment concentrated at Khassa, in Palestine, where they were joined by the 2nd Battery in May. A third battery was raised for the regiment in September, designated as the 51st Battery. The regiment remained in the Middle East until February 1942 when the 6th Division was recalled to Australia in response to the growing threat posed by Japan's entry into the war. En route to Australia, the 16th and 17th Brigades, including the 2/3rd Field Regiment, were diverted to Ceylon where they formed a defensive garrison amidst concerns about a possible Japanese invasion. As there were no artillery staff within the divisional headquarters on Ceylon, the regiment came directly under the command of the 16th Brigade at this time, and was based around Horana where they undertook defensive duties in the south of the island; the 1st Battery was detached to support the 2/1st Infantry Battalion around Katukurunda at this time. The 2nd Battery relieved them in May.

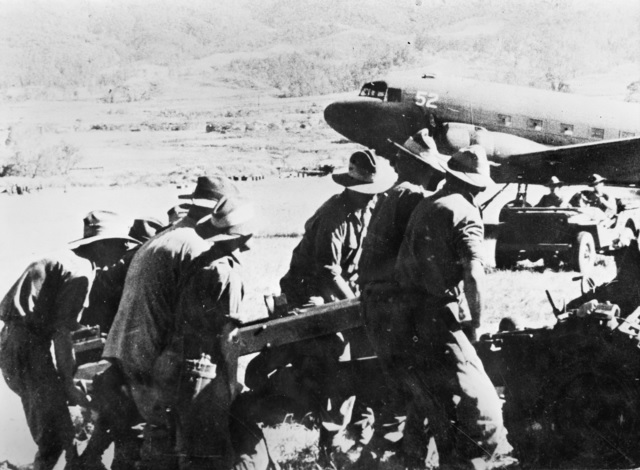
A 25-pounder of the 2/1st Field Regiment is unloaded from a Dakota on the airfield at Wau. The gun was assembled and fired at Japanese positions around Wau later that day.

The regiment remained on Ceylon until July 1942, when the 16th and 17th Brigades completed their return to Australia. Arriving in August, the regiment was reconstituted at Greta, New South Wales. By this time, in New Guinea, the Japanese were advancing towards Port Moresby. The Militia troops that had initially delayed the advance had been reinforced by the 21st and 25th Brigade, and together these troops halted the Japanese advance. The 16th Brigade was subsequently deployed as the Australians began a counter offensive to push the Japanese back to their beachheads around Buna–Gona. The 2/1st Field Regiment was assigned to the defence of Port Moresby initially, but in November detached elements of the 51st Battery to support the US 32nd Infantry Division's attack on Buna, while the remainder of the battery was assigned to support the 7th Division's attack on Gona. In January 1943, the 2nd Battery, and regimental headquarters, moved forward to Buna, and the 1st Battery was moved to Wau where they supported Kanga Force during the Battle of Wau. Meanwhile, the main part of the regiment was used to raise X Field Battery around Pari, to crew 18-pounder field guns near the newly established port facilities at Buna, before being sent to Oro Bay. By February 1943, they were relieved by the 2/6th Field Regiment and moved back to Port Moresby, while the 1st Battery remained at Wau throughout the Salamaua–Lae campaign.

They returned to Australia in August 1943, and after leave, the unit was reconstituted at Narellan, New South Wales. The 1st Battery arrived a month later. After this, the regiment was detached from the 6th Division, which was reorganised for jungle warfare. This resulted in a reduction of the division's artillery regiments to just one. The regiment was reassigned to the 1st Division at this time and undertook labouring duties on the Sydney wharves before moving to Ravenshoe, Queensland in February 1944. Here they were assigned as corps artillery to the 1st Australian Corps. A further move to Mapee followed in May 1944, before the regiment was reassigned to the 6th Division, as the number of artillery regiments assigned to the division was increased. In September 1944, the regiment moved to Wondecla, Queensland, where it began preparations for deployment overseas. The regiment did not see action again until late in the war when it was committed to the Aitape–Wewak campaign in late 1944 when Australian forces took over from US troops, which were redeployed to the Philippines. Arriving in January 1945, the main body of the regiment remained around the airfield at Aitape, undertaking defensive duties, while the 1st Battery supported the 16th Brigade's advance along the Danmap River. The regiment moved forward to Naguib in May, where they supported the 19th Brigade's push towards Wewak, and then final operations around Mount Shiburangu. The regiment was out of the line, resting at Wewak, when the war came to an end in August 1945.

The units of the 2nd AIF were disbanded in 1945 and 1946 as part of the demobilisation of the Australian military after World War II. This process was delayed due to a lack of shipping, but over the course of several months small drafts of personnel were sent back to Australia, based on a points system to determine priority. Meanwhile, to occupy the troops sports and recreational activities were organised, and a vocational education scheme established. In December 1945, the demobilisation process increased as several drafts were sent home on the troopship Duntroon. In early January 1946, the main body of the unit, consisting of 358 men, returned aboard the Duntroon, while 107 personnel who did not have enough points for discharge were transferred to the 4th Infantry Battalion for further service. The regiment's guns embarked on 24 January and two days later, the regiment's headquarters closed.

During the war, around 2,000 men served with the 2/1st Field Regiment and the regiment's casualties amounted to 26 dead, 77 wounded and 71 captured. The following decorations were bestowed: three Distinguished Service Orders, four Military Crosses, four Military Medals, one British Empire Medal and 29 Mentions in Despatches. One member was also appointed an Officer of the Order of the British Empire. The regiment's numerical designation is perpetuated by the 1st Regiment, Royal Australian Artillery, a regular Army artillery unit.

== Commanders ==
The following officers commanded the 2/1st Field Regiment during the war:

- Lieutenant Colonel Leo Kelly (1939–1940)
- Lieutenant Colonel Lewis Barker (1940–1941)
- Lieutenant Colonel Hugh Harlock (1941–1942)
- Lieutenant Colonel Keith O'Connell (1942–1945)
