= Silent Reach =

Australian miniseries

- Genre: mini-series
- Written by: Ted Roberts
- Directed by: Howard Rubie
- Starring: Robert Vaughn; Helen Morse; Graham Kennedy
- Country of origin: Australia
- Original language: English
- No. of episodes: 2

Production
- Producer: Jill Robb
- Running time: 2 x 150 mins

Original release
- Network: Nine Network
- Release: 2 March – 9 March 1983

Silent Reach is a 1983 Australian mini-series based on the novel by Osmar White.

== Premise ==
Conwright Industries, a huge mining company, hire American intelligence agent Steve Sinclair to investigate a series of sabotage incidents.

== Cast ==
- Robert Vaughn as Steve Sinclair
- Helen Morse as Antonia Russell
- Graham Kennedy as Chaster Fitzpatrick
- Leonard Teale as Hamilton Wrightson
- Peter Mountford as John Howard
- Justine Saunders as Allison Burnie
- Tom E. Lewis as Ben Burnie
- Ron Graham as Father Valdera
- Betty Lucas as Sister Beatrix

== Production ==
Osmar White's novel was published in 1979. It was based on research trips White had taken to Queensland and Western Australia. The novel was published in the US, UK and Australia. It was White's tenth book and second novel.

Film rights were bought in 1980 by AAV Productions, a subsidiary of David Syme & Co. The producer was Jill Robb, who announced they would make an eight-part television series. It eventually became a five-hour project.

Robb could not initially get an Australian network interested in the project. She raised finance from Postwork Newsweek Stations in the USA along with the Queensland Film Corporation, the AFC and a consortium of private investors. This enabled her to finance the mini-series which she sold to the Nine Network.

The project was known during filming as The Alcheringa Stone. The shoot took place in 1981 in Queensland, with location work in Brisbane, Chatsworth (south of Mt Isa), and Maryborough.

== Reception ==
The mini-series was considered a ratings disappointment.

The Age said the mini-series had "a lot going for it", saying the script and direction "are above the middlebrow soapie level... it looks good and is full of incident".
