= Chester Wilmot =

Australian war correspondent

Reginald William Winchester Wilmot
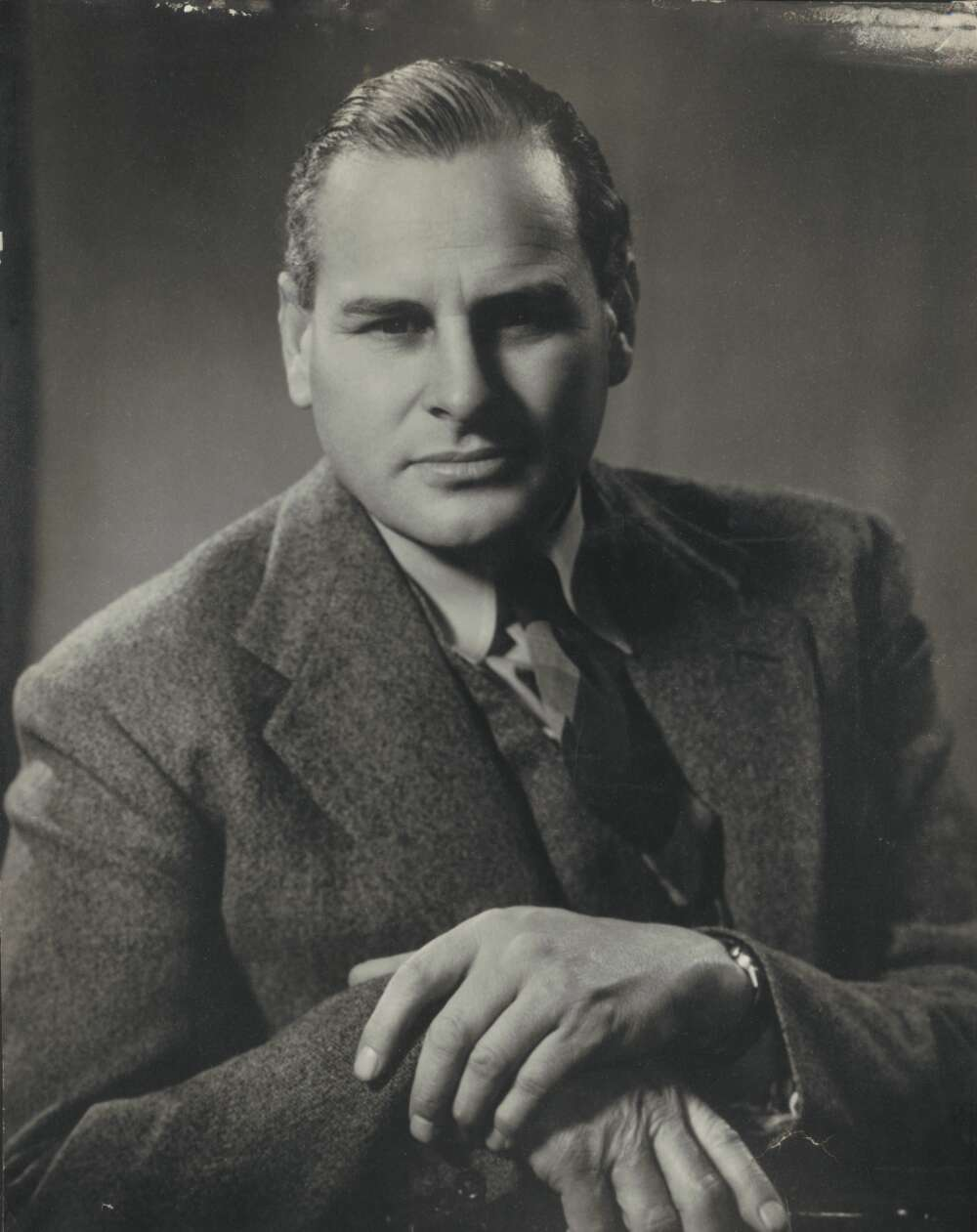
- Born: 21 June 1911; Brighton, Victoria, Australia
- Died: 10 January 1954 (aged 42); Mediterranean Sea, off Elba
- Occupation: Broadcast reporter

Reginald William Winchester Wilmot (21 June 1911 – 10 January 1954) was an Australian war correspondent who reported for the BBC and the ABC during the Second World War. After the war he continued to work as a broadcast reporter, and wrote a well-appreciated book about the liberation of Europe. He was killed in the crash of a BOAC Comet over the Elba island.

== Early life ==
Wilmot was born in Brighton, a suburb of Melbourne; he was the son of Reginald Wilmot, a sports journalist, and grandson of surveyor JGW Wilmot. He attended Melbourne Grammar School which he captained in 1930. He then took an arts degree at the University of Melbourne, majoring in history and politics under Sir Ernest Scott (BA 1935), followed by a law degree (LLB 1936). He resided at Trinity College and represented the university in debating in 1932–33 and 1935. He established a friendly rivalry with Alan Moorehead. As a president of the Students' Representative Council in 1936, he supported the vice-chancellor Raymond Priestley and was instrumental in the formation of the National Union of Australian University Students. He was invited to address the Australian Broadcasting Commission. In September 1938, during the Munich crisis, he visited Berlin, Nuremberg and Vienna in Nazi Germany on an international tour with the University of Melbourne's debating team, and attended a Nuremberg Rally. He began to work as an articled law clerk at the insistence of his family in February 1939.

== War reporter ==
After a brief legal career of a few months, the outbreak of the Second World War led Wilmot to join the Australian Broadcasting Commission. He was sent to the Middle East in September 1940 and reported from North Africa, Greece and Syria, pioneering broadcast interviews; he was in Tobruk during the siege of 1941. When Japan entered the war, Wilmot returned to Australia, then went out to cover the war in the Pacific. He reported from Papua during the Japanese invasion in 1942, including the Kokoda Track campaign, where he walked up to the forward area, around Abuari and Isurava, with fellow war correspondent Osmar White and cinematographer Damien Parer. Wilmot regarded General Sir Thomas Blamey as incompetent and protested at his sacking of Lieutenant General Sydney Rowell.

Blamey cancelled Wilmot's accreditation as a war correspondent in October 1942 for spreading a false rumour that Blamey was taking payments from the laundry contractor at Puckapunyal. Wilmot was reinstated, but on 1 November 1942, Blamey again terminated Wilmot's accreditation, this time for good.

== BBC work ==
There Wilmot wrote a book about his experiences in Tobruk, and narrated a documentary film called Sons of the ANZACs. In 1944 Wilmot transferred to the BBC where he was one of the principal reporters for D-Day, flying in a glider with the 6th Airborne Division. He was present at and reported from the field for most of the actions during the liberation of Europe. In October 1944, he entered the Herzogenbusch concentration camp in the Netherlands with the British Second Army and reported on it for the BBC, which removed his account of Frits Philips's assistance to fellow Jewish inmates. He also covered the Bergen-Belsen concentration camp in April 1945. When the German high command surrendered, Wilmot was present to report on it.

== Military historian ==
After the end of the war Wilmot remained in England, where he wrote articles on the recent war as well as a book about World War II, The Struggle for Europe. He conducted interviews for it with ex-Nazi military commanders, such as Hans Speidel and Günther Blumentritt, who were now involved in the development of the Bundeswehr. When it appeared in 1952, the book was favourably reviewed, and it is well regarded by military historians (John Keegan wrote, "Wilmot effectively invented the modern method of writing contemporary military history"). One of his articles criticizing the Allied plan to occupy Germany appeared in Life magazine.

Wilmot was selected to write a volume on the Siege of Tobruk and Battle of El Alamein for the Australian official history of the war, but was killed in the Comet crash; see Australia in the War of 1939–1945.

== Broadcaster ==
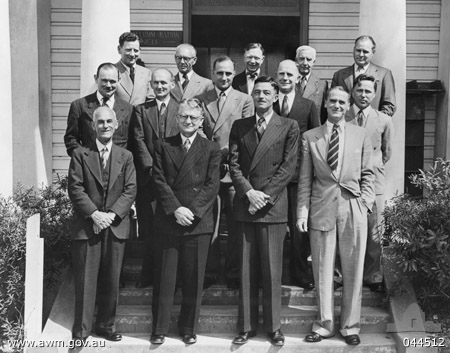
Wilmot (right, back row), with war historians in Australia

Wilmot was part of the television commentary team for the coronation of Queen Elizabeth II. For Christmas 1953, Wilmot was sent by the BBC to Australia to participate in a round-the-world broadcast on Christmas Day, where he narrated The Queen's Journey, telling the story of recent royal visits. The Queen herself was in New Zealand for Christmas.

== Death ==
Wilmot was en route back to Britain from that assignment on BOAC Flight 781 when his plane, a Comet 1, broke up following explosive decompression over the Mediterranean Sea; all aboard were killed. He had first boarded the flight in Rangoon.

== Books ==
- Tobruk 1941, Capture - Siege - Relief, Angus & Robertson Ltd, 1945.
- The Struggle For Europe, 1952. Reissue: Wordsworth Editions Ltd, Ware, Hertfordshire, 1997. ISBN 1-85326-677-9.
