= Kanga Force =

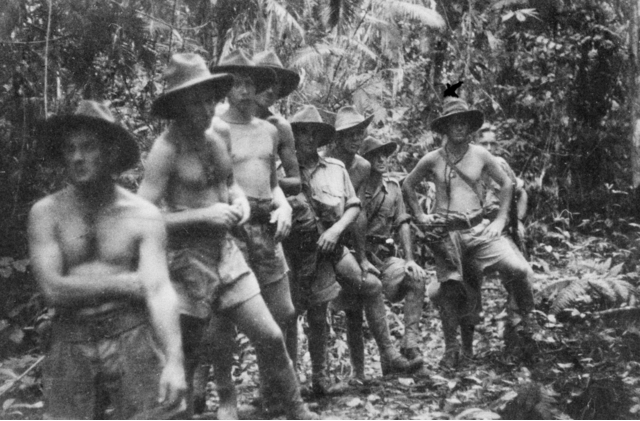
- A section of 'C' Platoon, 2/5th Independent Company, marching along a jungle track, west of Bulwa in the Bulolo Valley.(AWM Photo).
- Active: April 1942 – April 1943
- Country: Australia
- Branch: Australian Army
- Type: Composite force
- Role: Guerilla operations
- Size: 700 men at full strength (450 effectives)
- Engagements: World War II, New Guinea campaign
- Battle honours: No battle honours were awarded

Commanders
- Notable commanders: Norman Lawrence Fleay

Kanga Force was the name given to a composite ad hoc formation of the Australian Army that served in New Guinea during World War II. Commanded by Major Norman Fleay, it was formed on 23 April 1942. Made up of elements from the 1st and 2/5th Independent Companies and the New Guinea Volunteer Rifles (NGVR), Kanga Force conducted a number of small scale raids and reconnaissance operations around Lae and Salamaua before it was disbanded and the individual units became part of the Australian 3rd Division in 1943.

== History ==
In April 1942 a decision was made by the Australian Army high command to form a guerilla unit, known as Kanga Force, whose job it would be initially to conduct a reconnaissance of Japanese troops at Lae and Salamaua and then later to start a limited offensive to harass and destroy enemy personnel and equipment in the area. With this in mind, the reinforcement platoon of the 1st Independent Company which had sailed to Port Moresby on the Macdui and renamed Independent Platoon Port Moresby under the command of Captain Howard, was sent to reinforce the NGVR, who were at the time the only Allied troops in the Wau-Bulolo area.

In May 1942, following the completion of the Battle of the Coral Sea, General Thomas Blamey and American General Douglas MacArthur agreed that it was time to launch the limited offensive that they had agreed upon. As a part of this offensive, MacArthur requested that ground raids be initiated against Lae and Salamaua to destroy enemy installations and, if possible, to occupy the airfields. On 12 May, Major Norman Fleay, was appointed to command Kanga Force and was ordered to concentrate in the Markham Valley, in order to launch a surprise attack on Lae and Salamaua.

On 23 May, the 2/5th Independent Company, under Major Kneen, were flown in from Port Moresby by the U.S. 21st Troop Carrier Squadron into Wau Airfield to reinforce Kanga Force. Together with Howard's platoon and the NGVR, these units formed Kanga Force, and as the situation developed it was given the task to start a limited offensive to harass and destroy enemy personnel and equipment in the area. Supplies to Kanga Force were either flown in, depending on aircraft availability, or shipped to the mouth of the Lakekamu River in small craft, transported up the river to Bulldog in canoes and then carried over the Bulldog Track by native porters.

By June, Kanga Force was largely concentrated at Wau, although there were elements of the 2/1st and 2/5th spread out as far as Bulwa, and elements of the NGVR at Mapos. The NGVR was still watching the Salamaua sector from Mubo, whilst other elements were covering the inland routes from the Markham and Wampit Rivers. As Major Fleay attempted to juggle his forces and relieve the exhausted NGVR detachments, his orders from higher were clarified and work began on planning a number of raids in the area. At this stage it was believed that there were up to 2,000 Japanese troops at Lae and another 250 at Salamua. Against this Kanga Force had a frontage of 700 men, although only 450 were fit for battle. Additionally, the requirement to defend the numerous tracks through the Bulolo Valley meant that Fleay had even less resources to achieve his mission.

As such, Fleay decided to maintain a large force in the Bulolo Valley and to launch a number of raids in the area. These would be concentrated on the Japanese force at Heath's Plantation, where the Japanese formed an obstacle to any large-scale movement against Lae, on the Lae area to destroy aircraft, dumps and installations and to test the defences with a view to operations on a larger scale in the future; on the Salamaua area to destroy the wireless station, aerodrome installations and dumps.

In this vein, on 29 June 1942, two raids were undertaken at Heath's Plantation and Salamaua. The raid on Heath's Plantation at Lae, was carried out by 58 troops, mainly from the 2/5th Independent Company, but watchdogs warned the enemy of the raid, and subsequently the 2/5th's commander, Major Kneen, was killed and two men were wounded. The raid on Salamaua by 71 troops of the 2/5th and the NGVR was more successful and resulted in at least 100 Japanese troops being killed for the loss of only three men slightly wounded. In addition, the Australians captured a small amount of enemy equipment and a number of documents, including marked maps, sketches, and Japanese orders.

After the raid, reconnaissance reports indicated that the Japanese were starting to reinforce Lae and Salamaua. The Allies were concerned about the defence of the important air installation at Wau and to secure the crest of the Owen Stanleys in that area. Consequently, the 2/7th Independent Company was flown into Wau in October 1942 to reinforce Wau. Anticipating an attack by the Japanese, General Thomas Blamey ordered the 17th Brigade from Milne Bay to reinforce Wau and relieve Kanga Force, and on 16 January 1943 the Japanese launched an offensive against Wau, known as the Battle of Wau.

Following this, as problems with supply and sickness reduced the effectiveness of Fleahy's force, Kanga Force was eventually disbanded on 23 April 1943 and the individual units became part of the 3rd Division, which left Wau to begin the Salamaua-Lae campaign on 22 April 1943 and drove the Japanese from Salamaua.

== See also ==
- Australian commandos
