= Bulldog Track =

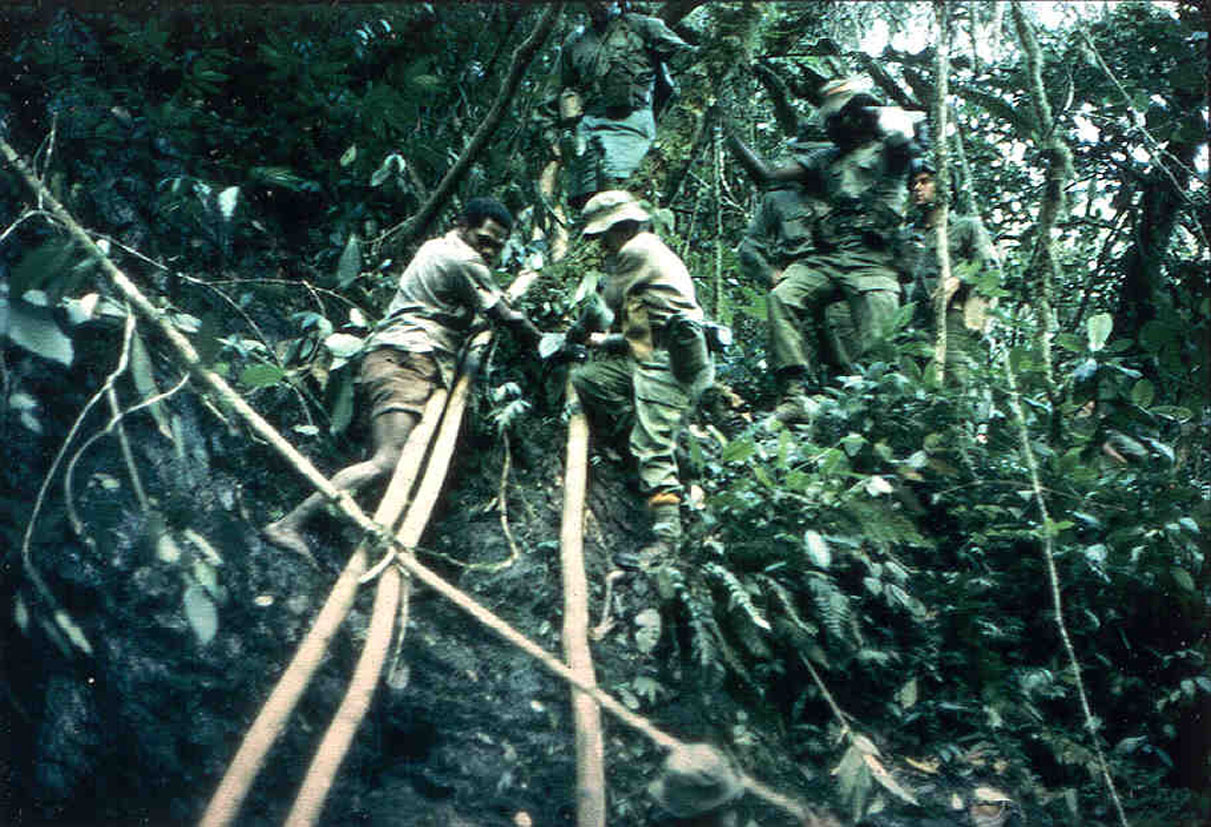
Negotiating steep sections in 1970s

The Bulldog Track, also known as the Bulldog-Wau road and Reinhold's Highway, is a foot track crossing the western end of the Owen Stanley Range of Central Papua New Guinea. The track begins near a small settlement on the upper reaches of the Lakekamu River on the south side of the ranges. After penetrating dense equatorial rain forests it winds up around jungle clad ridges for some sixty kilometres to over 9,800 feet (3,000 metres) on the Central Ranges before dropping down to the township of Wau in the Bulolo Valley.

The track is some one hundred kilometres due west of the famous Kokoda Track and crosses some of the most rugged and isolated terrain in the world, combining hot humid days with intensely cold nights, torrential rainfall and endemic tropical diseases such as malaria. Bulldog Track was longer, higher, steeper, wetter, colder and rougher than Kokoda Track. For the moment it is one of the few great treks in the Tropical montane regions of the world. Constructed sixty years ago, it was the only vehicular road ever to cross the Central Ranges of New Guinea.

In order to reach the Bulldog Track it is a short drive south east from Wau to the village of Winima. A six-hour walk will take you along a divergent track that was used as an alternate line of communication, during construction of the Track, commonly referred to as the Kudjeru Track. The villagers at Winima will be able to provide guides and directions for the Kudjeru Track. The Hidden Valley Gold Mine has cut off the highest sections of the track, which are now only accessible from the Papuan side.

== History ==
In 1943 Australian Army engineers; the 2/1 and 2/16 Field Company RAE, 9th Australian Field Company (AIF), veterans of Syria, Palestine, Egypt, Greece and Crete, the 1st and 3rd Australian Pack Transport Companies and local Papuan labour cut the road with pickaxes and dynamite over a period of eight months. The Chief Engineer, W. J. Reinhold, was later to write "Every foot of progress made on this road exacted the ultimate in courage, endurance, skill and toil. Its construction took a toll from surveyor, engineer, labourer and native carrier alike." During five months of operations over seventy per cent of the 2/1 Australian Field Company contracted malaria.

Along many sections, road-surfacing materials was practically non-existent. The climate ranged from torrid heat to icy cold. The annual rainfall ranged between 150 and 200 inches. These wet conditions combined with the topographic features made construction extremely difficult. In a few minutes a landslide would destroy weeks of labour. The construction gangs would stop, repair the work and move on. As work progressed the problem of maintaining a supply line became formidable. Work was often suspended for lack of petrol, oil, grease, explosives, drill steel, jackbits or other essentials. Nearly all work in the high central section of the road was done with picks, shovels and crowbars. Since blacksmiths tools were slow in arriving and forges awkward to transport, it was often necessary to use badly blunted tools.

The purpose of the road was to provide a supply line for future military operations in the Markham Valley and on the northern coasts of Papua New Guinea. On the late afternoon of August 22, 1943, the road was finally completed and two jeeps crossed from Edie Creek to Bulldog.

On September 23, the first three-ton trucks crossed the road successfully and the long supply line was finally open with 114 kilometres of road were now completed. Commencing at Bulldog at an altitude of 59 metres it rose by a series of long loops up through the steep river gorges of the southern watershed to an altitude of three thousand metres, then dropped down a series of ridges into the Wau valley.

Seventeen bridges were constructed; mostly single, but at least one with multiple spans. More than two thousand Australian army personnel and over two thousand Papuans and New Guineans were involved during nine months of construction. Thus the road, acclaimed as the greatest military engineering feat ever, was completed and for the only time in history motor vehicles crossed the high rugged mountains of Papua New Guinea.

== Gallery ==
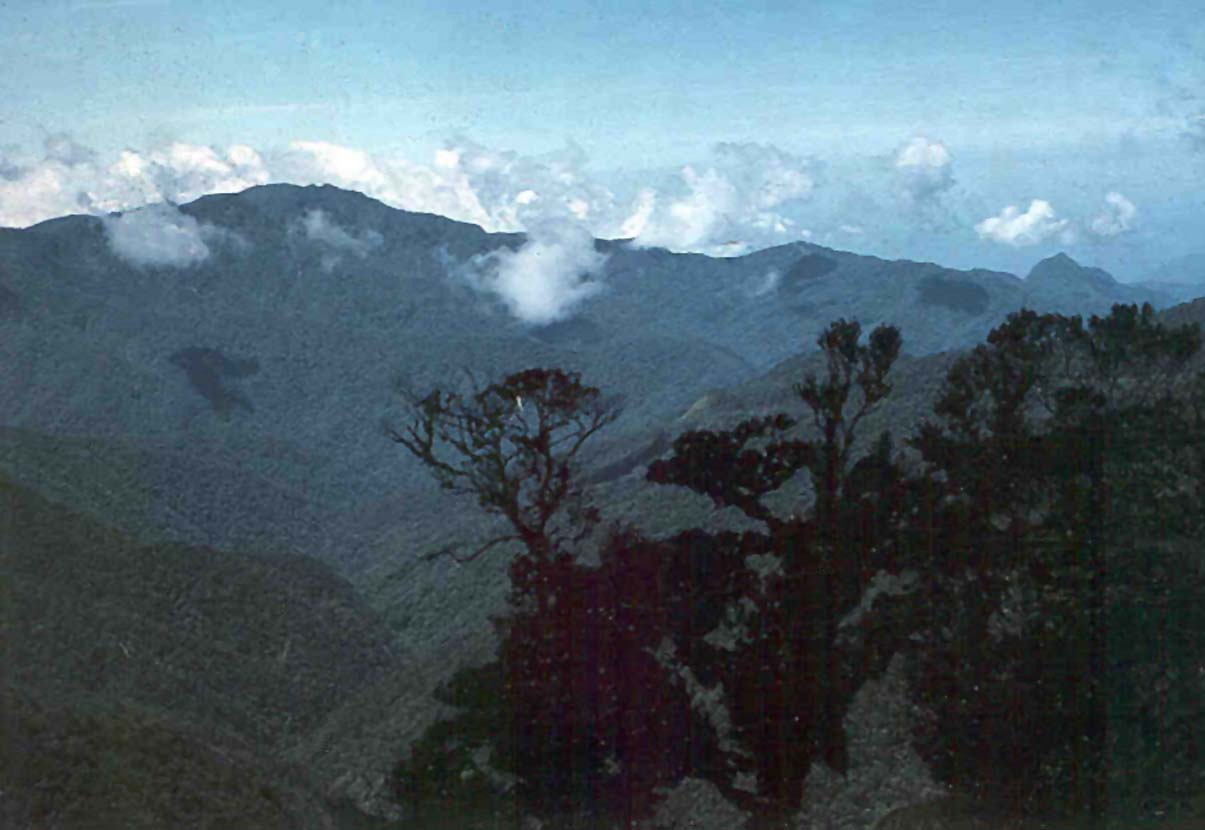
Ekuti Range, central PNG. Road rounds spur on middle right

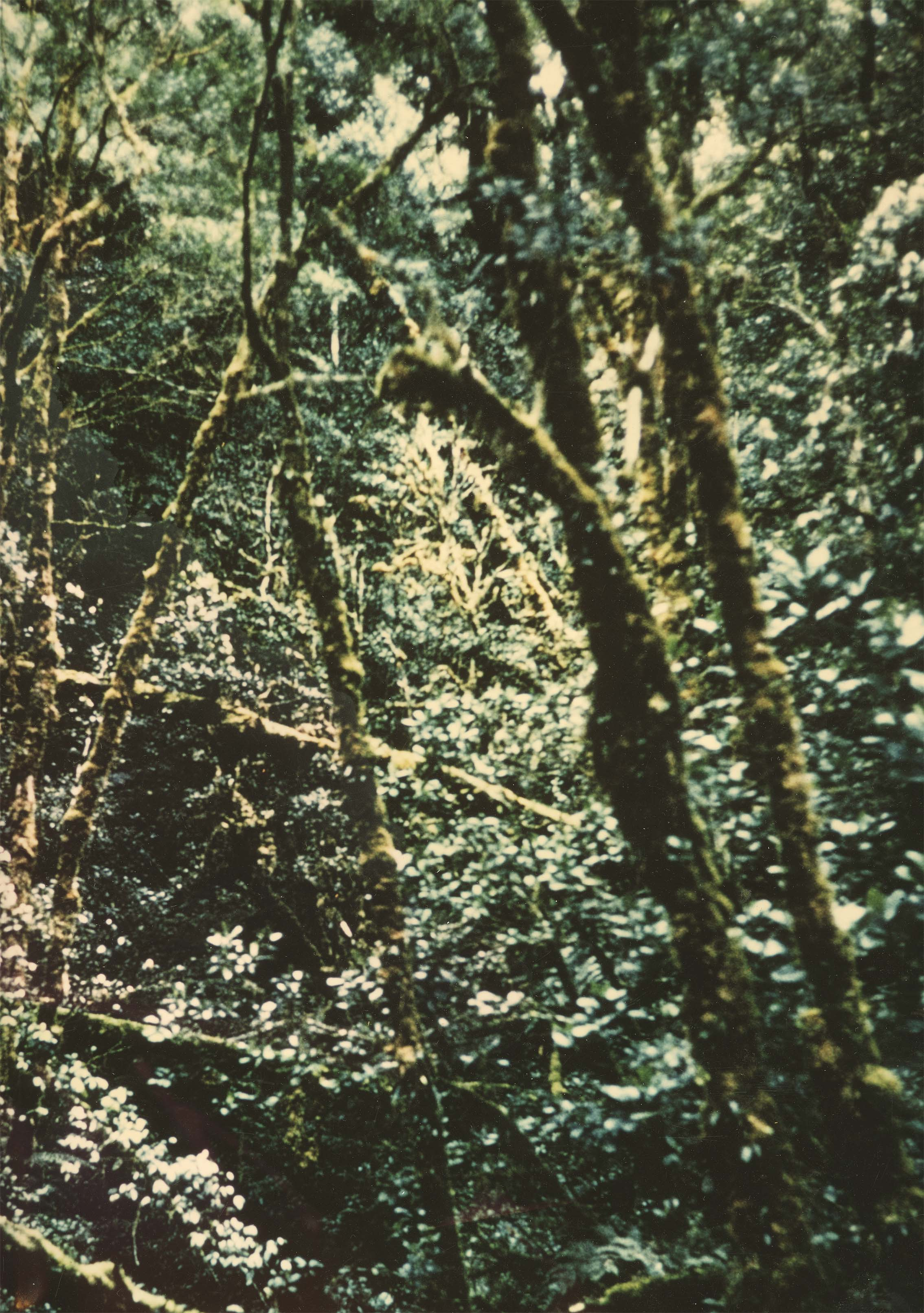
Higher Forest changes into Moss clad trees

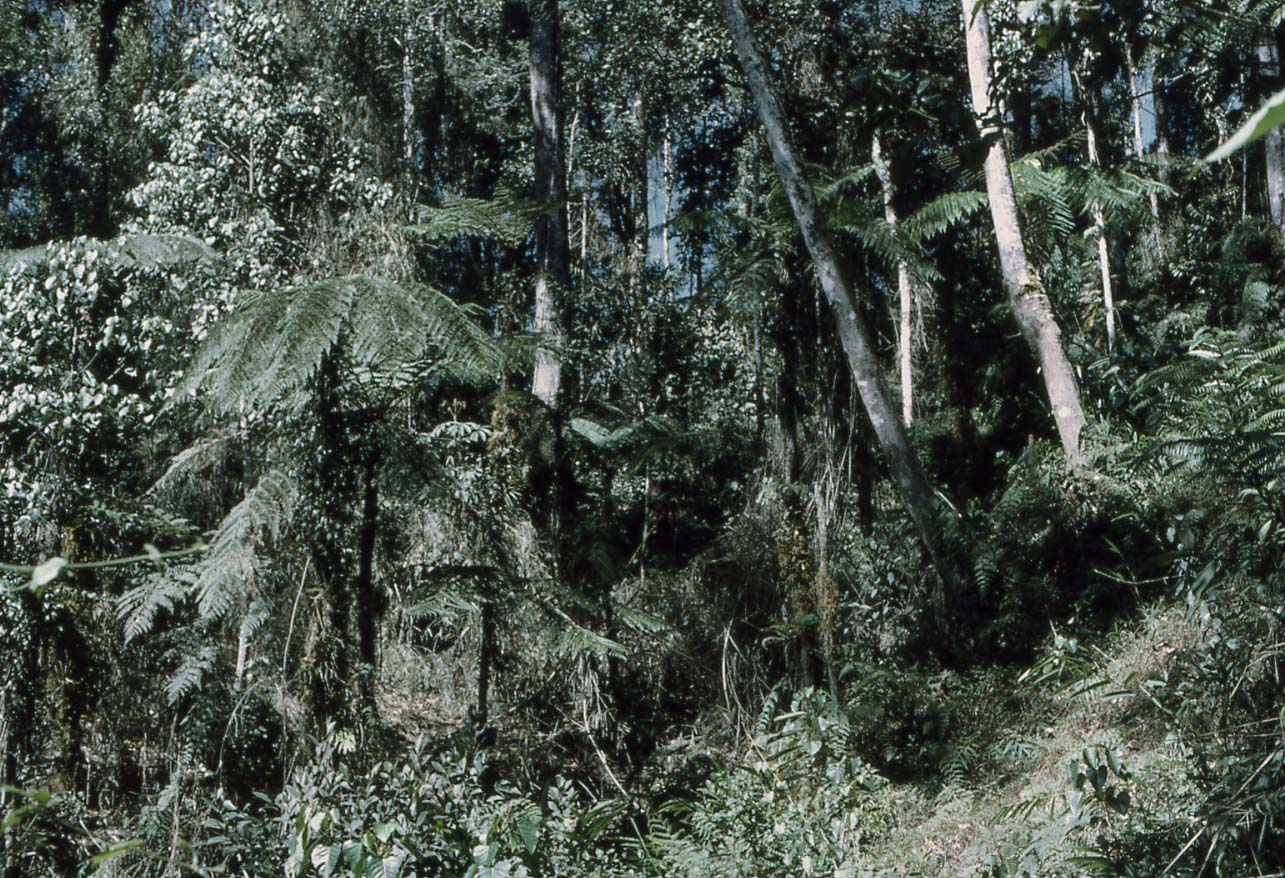
Dense Forest on mountain spurs

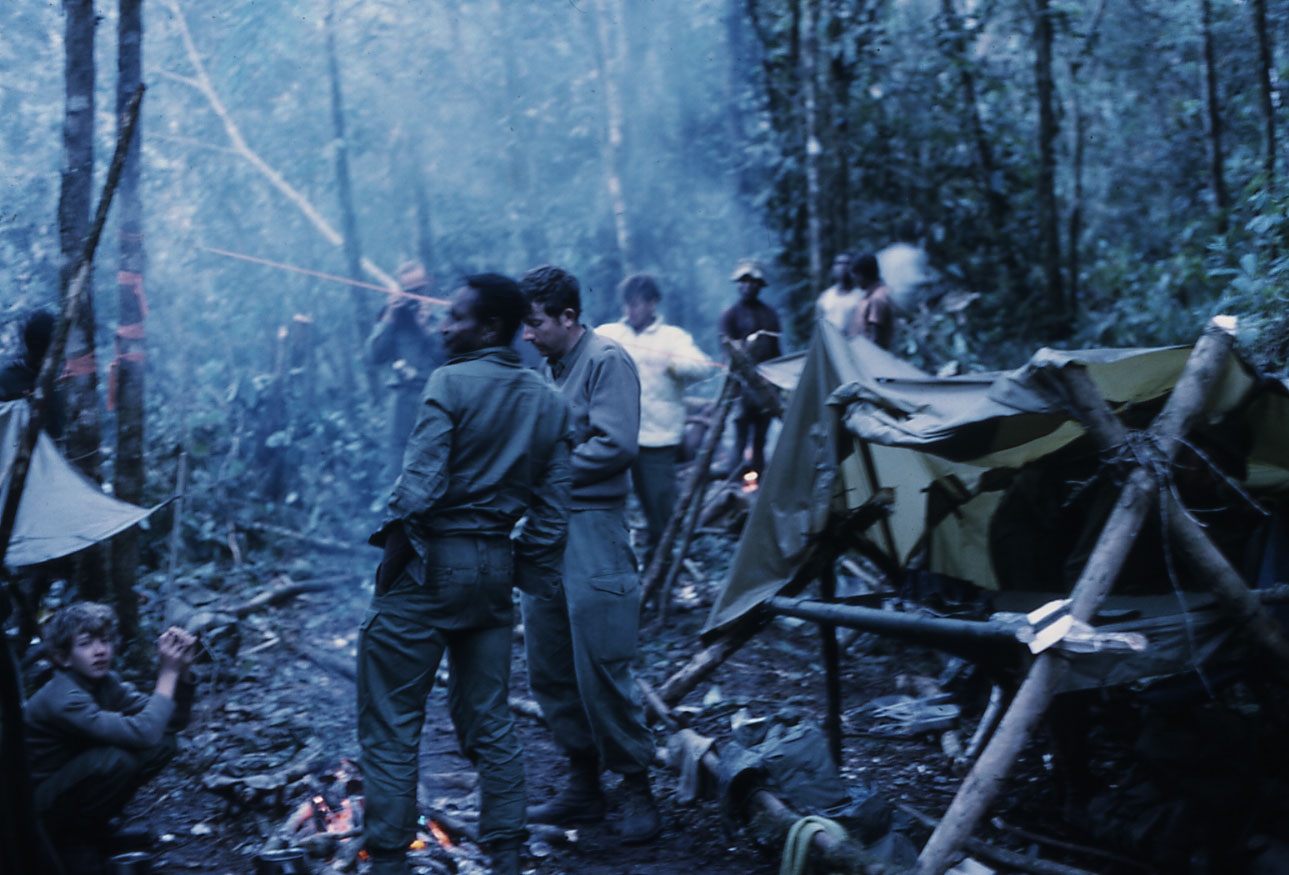
Camp on Ravine floor - wet and cold in the 1970s

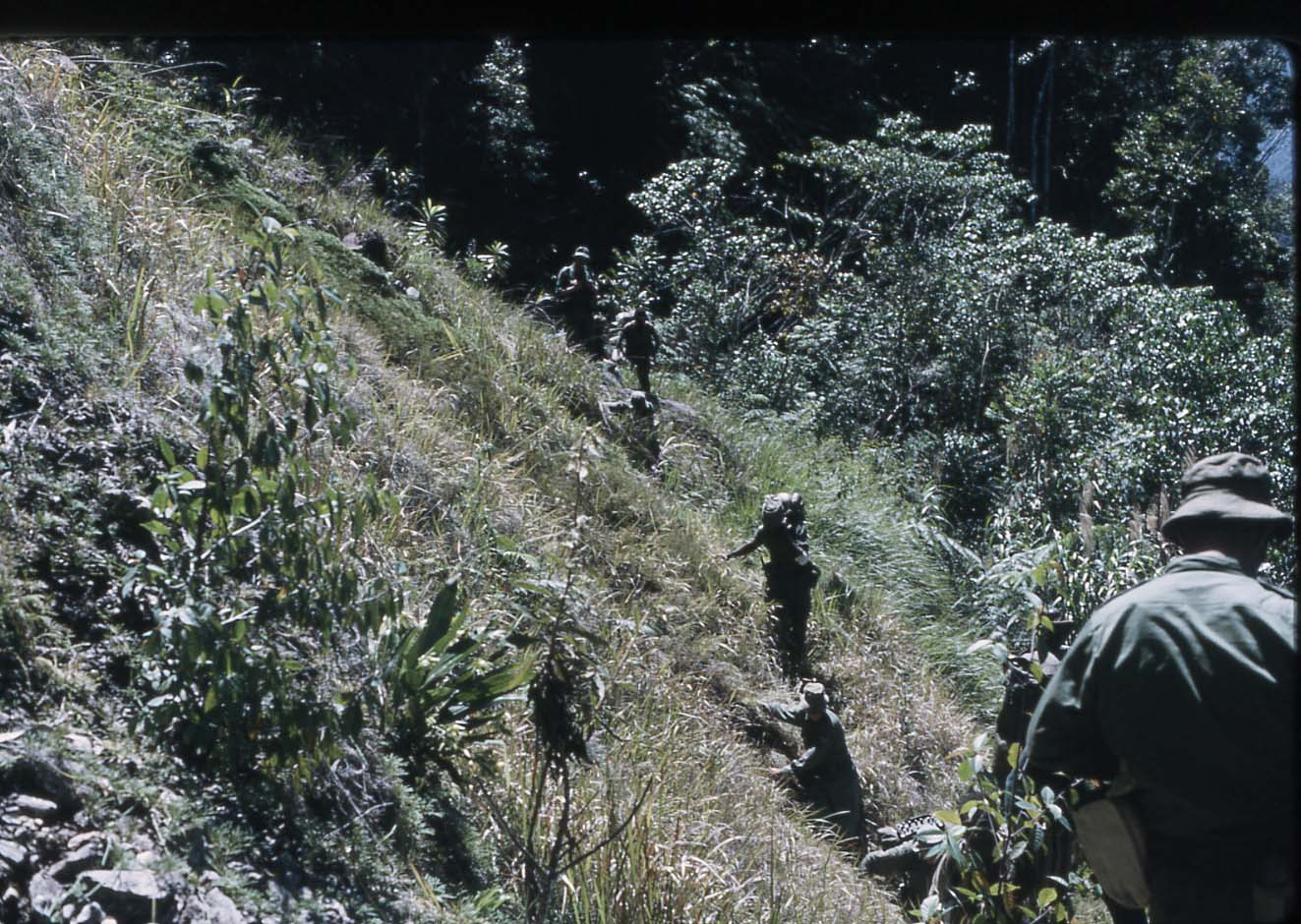
In the 1970s the road has collapsed

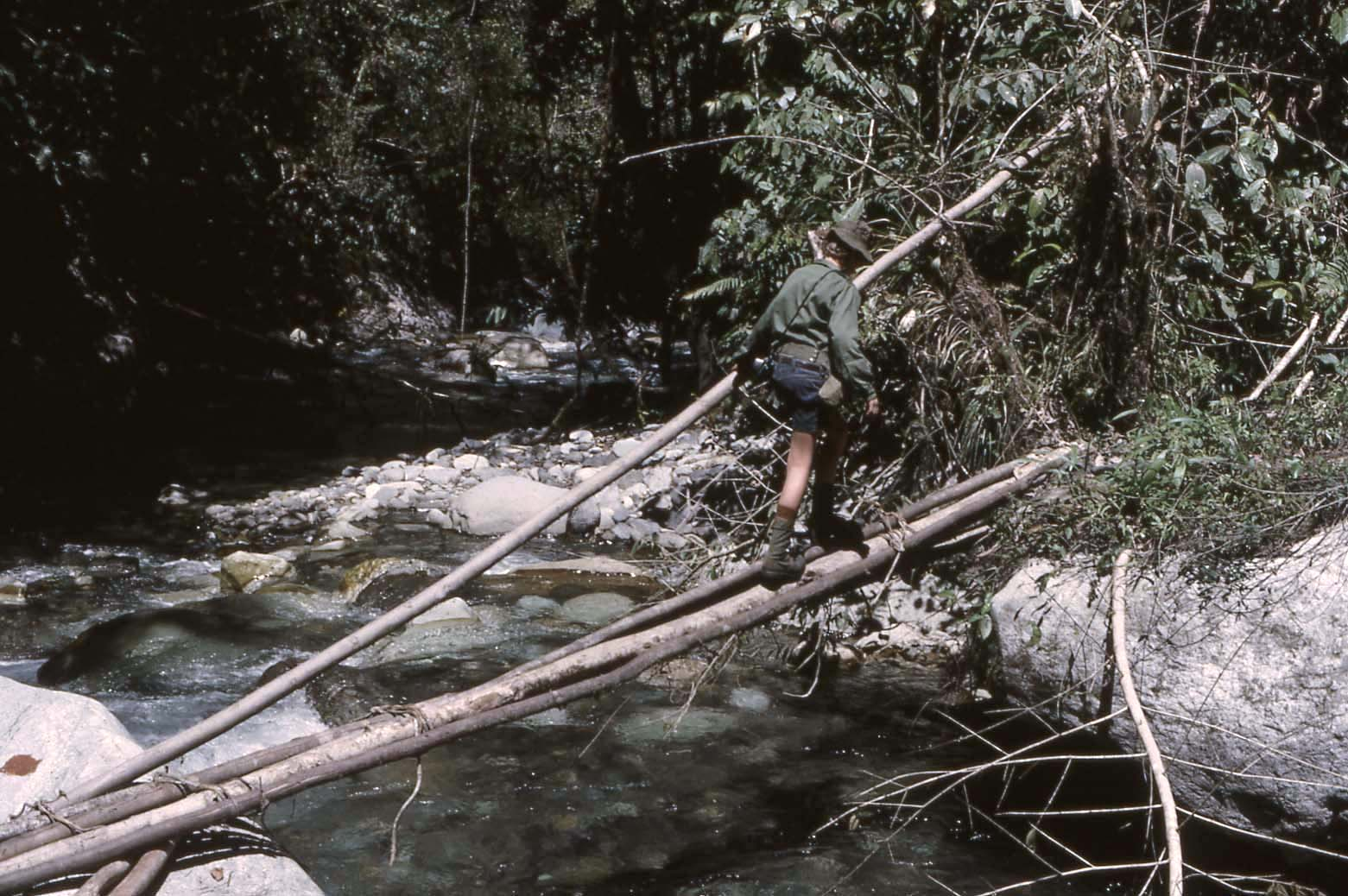
River bridge in the 1970s
