= Salamaua =

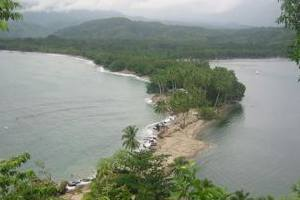
- Salamaua isthmus

- Location within Papua New Guinea
- Coordinates: 7°2′S 147°4′E
- Country: Papua New Guinea
- Province: Morobe Province
- Time zone: UTC+10 (AEST)
- Location: 36 km (22 mi) SSE of Lae

Salamaua (German: Samoahafen) was a small town situated on the northeastern coastline of Papua New Guinea, in Salamaua Rural LLG, Morobe province. The settlement was built on a minor isthmus between the coast with mountains on the inland side and a headland. The closest city is Lae, which can be reached only via boat across the gulf. It was the site of military engagements during the Second World War.

== History ==
In the 1920s prospective gold miners used Salamaua as a staging post to explore for gold in the inland areas. Gold was discovered at Wau and miners came from all over and made for the goldfields via the rough Black Cat Track.

In 1937, following the eruption of the Rabaul caldera which caused widespread damage to Rabaul, the Australian federal cabinet decided to move the capital of the Territory of New Guinea to Salamaua. This decision was later reversed and Lae was selected as the new capital.

The town was captured by the Japanese on 8 March 1942 during World War II and later retaken by Australian and United States forces led by General Douglas MacArthur on 11 September 1943 during the Salamaua–Lae campaign. During reoccupation the town was destroyed.

Today the villages of Kela and Lagui occupy the site, as well as holiday houses that are mainly owned by expatriates based in Lae.

== See also ==
- Invasion of Salamaua–Lae
- Salamaua–Lae campaign
- Raid on Salamaua (1942)
- Salamaua Rural LLG
