= Black Cat Track =

Coordinates: 7.0609°S 147.0438°E

The BCT
- Location: Morobe Province, Papua New Guinea
- Trailheads: Salamaua / Wau
- Use: Walking
- Difficulty: Hard
- Season: All
- Sights: WWII History, Jungle, Mountains

The Black Cat Track or Trail is a rough overland track in Morobe Province, Papua New Guinea. It runs from the village of Salamaua on the coast of the Huon Gulf, south into the mountains to the township of Wau. In the 21st century despite being a difficult journey it became a hiking destination for international trekkers.

== Name ==
The name is taken from the Black Cat Gold Mine in Wau. It is also known as the Skindawai Track.

== History ==
=== Gold Rush ===
The track started out in the 1920s and 30s as a trail for prospectors seeking to get rich on the gold in Wau. They traveled from the port Salamaua on a treacherous 3 to 4-day hike through leech-infested territory, a trail that recently has been described as "suitable only for masochists and Israeli Paratroopers".

Before Errol Flynn (who grew up in Australia and New Guinea) became an actor in 1933, he hiked this trail and commented that it was a rigorous march through leech-infested jungle, in constant fear of ambush, and lying awake at night wondering "whether that crawly sound you heard a few feet away might be a snake, a cassowary or maybe only a wild boar razorback ... I have seen Central Africa, but it was never anything like the jungle of New Guinea."

=== World War II ===
On 8 March 1942 in World War II, the town of Salamaua was captured by the Japanese. They had tried to take Port Moresby by sea, but were defeated in the Battle of the Coral Sea. Now they were going to take it by land. They tried to take the capital by going over the Owen Stanley mountain range, by the Kokoda Track, basing the operation out of Salamaua. They almost made it this time but were pushed back 30 miles short of the city, in a series of bloody battles. After this they converted Salamaua into a major supply base. After a few months had passed, they made their final attempt at Port Moresby, the Black Cat Trail. If they could capture the Allied Air Base in Wau, they could launch an offensive on the capital that would have overwhelmed the Australians, Americans, and Papua New Guinea Militia stationed there.

The Japanese attacked in force, but the Australian 17th Brigade, under Major-General Stanley Savige, held out until reinforcements (The three independent companies 2/3rd, 2/5th and 2/7th) arrived. Then on 23 April, the allies struck back along the trail, taking it until the hills called The Pimple, and Observation Hill. The Japanese were firmly entrenched there. The 2/7th attacked The Pimple, with mortar support, after it had been strafed by four aircraft, but the Japanese were too firmly entrenched, and the Australian advance was halted. The next day, they attacked again, supported by aircraft and the 1st mountain battery, limited to fifty rounds a gun, but again the attack failed. On 7 May, they attacked again, but again were driven back. Then on 9 May, the Japanese launched their own attack in the Pimple area. They surrounded the foremost Australian Company and started closing in. The Australians were not relieved until the afternoon of 11 May. By this time they had withstood eight attacks from parts of two Japanese battalions. The following day, they took The Pimple, supported by field guns, where before there had been only two mountain batteries.

The 2/3rd battalion had been pressing along while the 2/7th tried to take The Pimple, and in early May, they came to the Bobdubi Ridge. Seeing that it was only lightly held, they attacked it, and captured it on 4 May. They then held off all Japanese trying to retake it. From Bobdubi, the 2/3rd battalion severely harassed the Japanese. Their tactics were so successful that Major-General Savige had to tell them not to attempt too much, as "premature commitments in the Salamaua area could not be backed at present by an adequate force." Then on 14 May, the Japanese launched a full-scale attack, supported by guns and mortars, forcing the Australians to withdraw. On the 15th, over 100 Japanese planes attacked Australian positions in three raids, and on the 17th and 18th they raided the Wau airdrome.

In late May the 2/6th battalion arrived to relieve the 2/7th, and the 15th brigade headquarters and another battalion of that brigade started arriving in Savige's area. In mid June, the allies started acting as if they were going to attack Salamaua, but really the target was Lae, on the other side of the Huon Gulf. The Japanese fell for this and on the 19th and 20th, they seemed to anticipate an attack, and started patrolling aggressively. The plan worked as planned, but the allies didn't attack until early September. On 26 August, General Milford relieved Savige, with his 5th division headquarters. Salamaua was captured on 11 September 1943, a week after the Lae offensive began. Five days later Lae was taken.

== As a trekking destination ==
=== Trekking ===
The Black Cat Track is a tough course recommended only for "very fit and experienced trekkers".

=== 2013 Attack ===
On 10 September 2013 a trekking expedition was attacked by bandits known as Rascals. Two expedition porters were killed in the attack, and another died from the effects of wounds inflicted during the attack. Six people were arrested. The expedition's porters were targeted much more than the international trekkers, and the attack is believed to have been caused by a grudge related to money and the hiring of porters from different villages along the trekking route.
