= Battle of Thermopylae (1941) =

World War II battle during the German invasion of Greece

- Part of the Battle of Greece
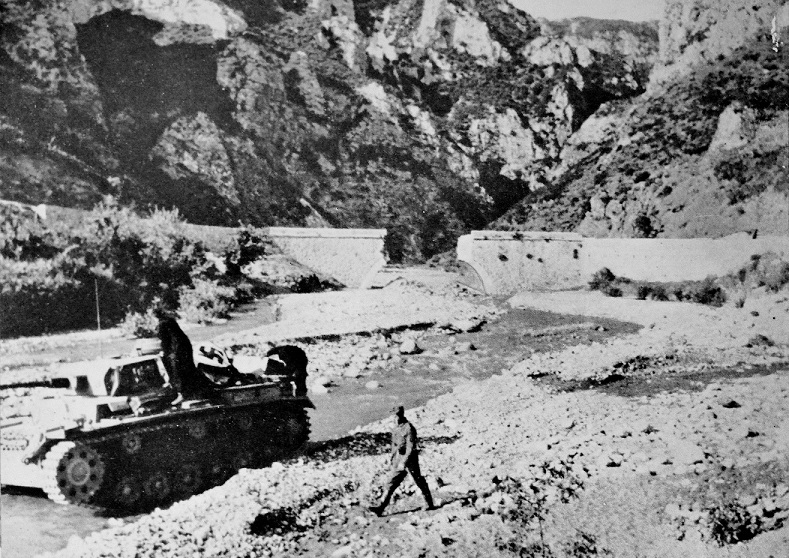
- German forces in Thermopylae following the battle
Date	24–25 April 1941
Location	Thermopylae, Greece
Result	Inconclusive

Belligerents
Germany	Australia; New Zealand; United Kingdom

Casualties and losses
100 killed and wounded, and 15 tanks destroyed.	Unknown

The Battle of Thermopylae, on 24–25 April 1941, was part of the German invasion of Greece during World War II.

== Background ==
Following the retreat of Allied forces from the mountain passes at Olympus and Servia, British Commonwealth forces began to set up defensive positions at the coastal pass at Thermopylae, famous for the Battle of Thermopylae in 480 BC. The New Zealand Army's 2nd Infantry Division under Lieutenant-General Bernard Freyberg was given the task of defending the pass, while elements of the Australian 6th Infantry Division, under Major General Iven Mackay, defended the village of Brallos.

In the New Zealand sector, the 5th Brigade was deployed in the foothills along the coastal road south of Lamia near the Spercheios River, covering the bridges on the road to Larisa. The 4th Brigade was positioned on the right flank, where it had established coast-watching patrols. The 6th Brigade was in reserve. The Australian force defending Brallos was composed predominantly of two battalions from the 19th Brigade, under Brigadier George Vasey: the 2/4th and 2/8th battalions. On 19 April, they were augmented by the 2/1st and 2/5th battalions (from the 16th and 17th Brigades respectively), which were also put under Vasey's command. Later that day and during the early hours of 20 April, the 2/11th Battalion, the third battalion composing the 19th Brigade, also arrived at Brallos.

Freyberg and Mackay had been informing their subordinates that there would be no more withdrawals, but both were unaware of higher-level discussions on the evacuation. After the battle, Mackay was quoted as saying: "I thought that we'd hang on for about a fortnight and be beaten by weight of numbers."

On 21 April, German air reconnaissance reported that the defense lines included only light field fortifications in the initial stage of construction, and that British troops were being evacuated from Salamis Island.

On the morning of 23 April, ANZAC Corps was ordered to retreat. It was decided that Thermopylae and Brallos would nevertheless be held by a rearguard comprising two brigades. The New Zealand 6th Brigade, under Brigadier Harold Barrowclough and the Australian 19th Brigade were to hold the passes as long as possible, allowing the other units to withdraw. Vasey said: "Here we bloody well are and here we bloody well stay." This was interpreted by Vasey's brigade major, A. T. J. "Ding" Bell, as meaning that the brigade would "hold its present defensive positions come what may", until the withdrawal had been completed.

== Action ==
A German battlegroup based on the 6th Mountain Division, under Generalmajor Ferdinand Schörner, attacked at 1130 hours on 24 April, meeting fierce resistance. Another battlegroup, drawn from the 5th Panzer Division, also attacked.

Early in the afternoon, the German armored forces were shelled near Lamia by artillery that was able to fire down into the pass from multiple, lightly fortified positions. Two tanks from the Panzer division later attempted to penetrate the lines of the 25th Battalion, but were destroyed by long range field guns.

Later in the day, four German tanks and a number of infantry troops being conveyed in trucks attempted to take a position in front of the 6th Brigade in front of the 25th Battalion's position, and after some initial confusion was repelled by 2-pound and 25-pound field guns.

With the delaying action accomplished, the rearguard began to destroy what equipment and field guns they could not transport, and retreated towards another defensive position at Thebes. The last Allied vehicles were evacuated by midnight, and Thermopylae would not be taken for another three hours, when the Germans led a formal attack on the vacated position. While holding their position for the specified amount of time, the Allied forces had destroyed 15 German tanks and inflicted considerable casualties.

== Aftermath ==
The Germans would continue their march down the country, eventually occupying the country.

The absence of the Greek Army, from a battle at a site as significant to the national psyche as Thermopylae, was controversial within Greece, as General Georgios Tsolakoglou had already capitulated. After the war, Aris Velouchiotis – a veteran of the 1941 campaign and leader of the Greek People's Liberation Army – argued that this fact was an eternal "shame" for the Greek regime that didn't take part in the battle. However, one Greek did take part in the battle. St Kilda-born Australian Gunner Dimitri "James" Zampelis, whose origins were from Lefkada, fought in the Battle of Thermopylae as a member of the Australian 2/2nd Field Regiment.
