= 2/8th Battalion (Australia) =

Infantry battalion of the Australian Army

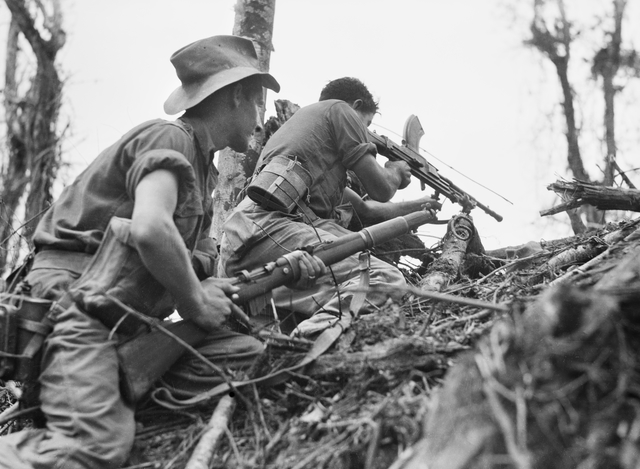
- An Australian light machine gun team in action near Wewak in June 1945
- Active: 1940–1945
- Country: Australia
- Branch: Australian Army
- Type: Infantry
- Size: ~800–900 men (Note: By the start of World War II, the authorised strength of an Australian infantry battalion was 910 men all ranks, however, later in the war it fell to 803.)
- Part of: 19th Brigade, 6th Division
- Engagements: World War II: North Africa campaign; Greek campaign; Aitape–Wewak campaign

Insignia
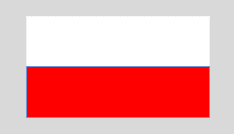
- Unit colour patch

The 2/8th Battalion was an infantry battalion of the Australian Army that served during World War II. Raised as part of the Second Australian Imperial Force at Melbourne, Victoria on 30 October 1939, the 2/8th was initially attached to the 17th Brigade, 6th Division. It was later transferred to the 19th Brigade and with this formation the battalion saw action in Egypt, Libya, Greece and Crete before returning to Australia. A period of garrison duty in Darwin followed in 1942–1943, after which the battalion concentrated with other 6th Division units on the Atherton Tablelands, remaining there throughout 1943–1944. In late 1944, the battalion was sent to New Guinea to fight the Japanese as part of the Aitape–Wewak campaign. The battalion was disbanded at Puckapunyal on 14 December 1945.

== History ==
=== Formation ===
The 2/8th Battalion (Note: The numerical designation of 2nd AIF units was prefixed by "2/", which was used to set them apart from Militia units with corresponding numerical designations.) was established at the Royal Melbourne Showgrounds in the period shortly after Australia declared war on Germany. Its official date of raising was 30 October 1939. Recruited as part of the all-volunteer Second Australian Imperial Force (2nd AIF), initially, the battalion formed part of the 17th Brigade, which was assigned to the 6th Division. Like other 2nd AIF infantry battalions raised at the time, the battalion had an authorised strength of around 900 personnel, and consisted of four rifle companies – designated 'A' to 'D' – under a battalion headquarters a headquarters company consisting of signals, carrier, pioneer, anti-aircraft, transport, administrative and mortar platoons. The colours chosen for the battalion's unit colour patch (UCP) were the same as those of the 8th Battalion, a Victorian infantry battalion which had been raised for service during World War I as part of the First Australian Imperial Force, and had subsequently been re-raised as Militia battalion. These colours were white over red, in a horizontal rectangular shape, although a border of grey was added to the UCP to distinguish the battalion from its Militia counterpart.

The battalion's first commanding officer was Lieutenant Colonel John Mitchell, who had served in the 8th Battalion during World War I and had subsequently commanded it during the inter-war years. Like Mitchell, the majority of the battalion's recruits came from the state of Victoria, with about one in every five having previously served in the Militia. Shortly after the battalion's establishment it was moved to Puckapunyal where it began individual training. In early 1940, the Australian Army was reorganised to bring it in line with the British Army by reducing the size of each brigade from four infantry battalions to three. The result of this was that 2/8th, as the fourth battalion within the 17th Brigade, was transferred to a new brigade, the 19th, which was formed from the 2/4th Battalion, a New South Wales battalion from the 16th Brigade, the 2/8th from the 17th and the Western Australian 2/11th from the 18th. After the completion of basic training, the battalion marched through the streets of Melbourne before embarking for the Middle East in mid-April aboard the troopship Dunera.

=== Middle East, Greece and Crete ===
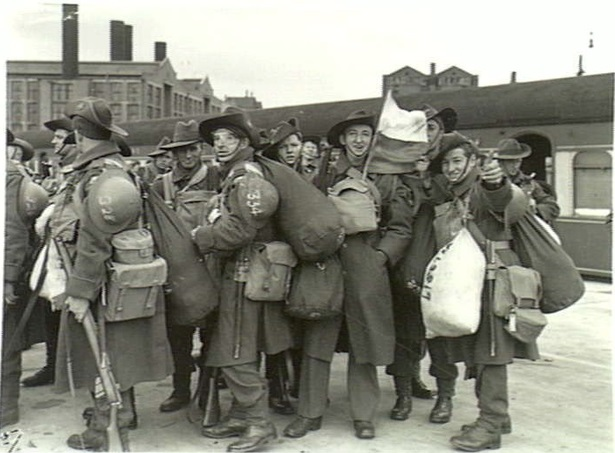
Reinforcements for the 2/8th detrain at Sydney, November 1941

After a month long voyage as part of a large convoy carrying Australian troops to the Middle East, the 2/8th reached El Kantara, in Egypt, on 18 May 1940. Upon arrival, the battalion concentrated at the Australian camp at Kilo 89, near Gaza, in Palestine, where it joined the rest of the 19th Brigade. It undertook further exercises and training in Egypt and Palestine prior to the Australians being committed to the fighting against the Italians in the Libyan desert in January 1941 during Operation Compass. A series of actions were fought by the Australians around Bardia and Tobruk, before the 19th Brigade entered Benghazi in February. The 2/8th Battalion had only a minor role in the early battles, but was heavily involved in the fighting for Tobruk, being thrown into an attack against an Italian strong hold that was supported by armour. In April 1941, as the Allies grew concerned about a German invasion of Greece, a combined force of British, Australian and New Zealand troops were deployed there from North Africa. Amidst freezing temperatures, the battalion took part in the fighting around Vevi, in northern Greece near the border with Yugoslavia, before the Australians were pushed back by a larger force. A series of withdrawals followed, during which the 2/8th lost most of its equipment and was broken up into several groups. As the Germans overran the country, the 2/8th was evacuated at the end of the month via Kalamata; part of the battalion – almost 200 personnel – were moved by sea back to Egypt, while the rest – almost 400 personnel – were landed on the island of Crete from Royal Navy destroyers, having originally embarked upon the Costa Rica, which had been sunk en route by several Axis dive-bombers.

They subsequently took part in the fighting on Crete following the German invasion on 20 May. Allocated to the Chania region, the battalion – temporarily under the command of Major Arthur Key – reinforced the British around Perivolia and Mournies, before fighting to hold the line to the west Perivolia as the 19th Brigade was temporarily reorganised to include the 2/7th Battalion and the 2nd Greek Battalion, under the command of Brigadier George Vasey. The battalion was later involved in the fighting around 42nd Street, where the 2/7th and the Maori Battalion launched a ferocious bayonet assault against a German force. As the Allies withdrew towards Sphakia where the Royal Navy was attempting an evacuation, the battalion formed part of the rearguard along with the 2/7th and some Royal Marines and artillerymen, before they were temporarily reassigned to the New Zealand 5th Infantry Brigade and with them had taken up positions around the Sphakia Gorge at the end of May as the final stage of the evacuation began. A total of 203 personnel from the 2/8th subsequently embarked on the cruiser Phoebe and destroyer Jackal in the final lift on the morning of 1 June. The 2/7th was not so lucky, with all but handful being left behind to become prisoners of war.

In the aftermath of the Crete campaign, the 2/8th was rebuilt in Palestine. Reinforcements were brought in at this time, and a new commanding officer, Lieutenant Colonel Robert Winning, arrived in July. After this, a period of garrison duty followed in Syria, as the 2/8th was dispatched to form part of the Allied occupation force that had been established there in the wake of the Syria–Lebanon campaign to defend against a possible Axis thrust through the Caucasus. They remained there between October 1941 and January 1942 when the Australian government requested their return to fight against the Japanese.

=== Garrison duties in Australia and service in New Guinea ===
Embarking upon the troopship Aronda at Port Tewfik on 12 February 1942, the sailed for Australia. After briefly disembarking at Port Sudan, they continued on to Colombo and then to Fremantle, before continuing on to their final destination. Arriving in Adelaide on 28 March 1942, the 2/8th took over billets in Strathalbyn before subsequently deploying by train to the Northern Territory, in late May to defend against a possible Japanese invasion, that never eventuated. During this time, the battalion was based around Adelaide River, about 76 miles (122 km) to the south of Darwin. From there they were poised to deploy across a broad front in the case of invasion. In February 1943, Lieutenant Colonel W. Stace Howden assumed command of the battalion after Winning took over command of the 3rd Brigade. While other elements of the 6th Division were sent to New Guinea in late 1942 and early 1943 and saw combat against the Japanese along the Kokoda Track and around Wau, the 19th Brigade remained in Darwin until June 1943, when the 19th Brigade was moved to northern Queensland as the 6th Division's other two brigades – the 16th and 17th – returned to Australia from New Guinea. As the division was brought back up to strength, a long period of training followed. Consequently, it was not until late in the war that the 2/8th was committed to its first, and only, campaign against the Japanese, deploying to Aitape–Wewak in November 1944, as the Australians took over from US forces in the region.

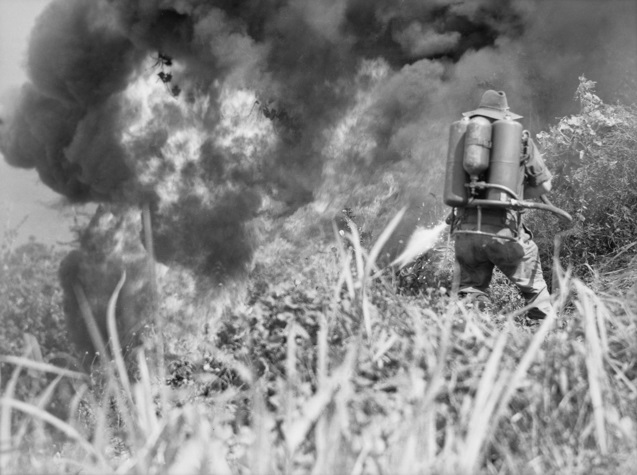
An Australian infantrymen uses a flamethrower against Japanese positions in Wewak, 1945

Sailing aboard the US troopship Thomas Corwin, the battalion arrived off Aitape on 12 November and came ashore aboard several landing craft. After moving into a camp around Korako, they began minor patrolling operations and reconnaissance around Anamo. The 19th Brigade was initially tasked with securing the area between around the Driniumor, Danmap and Danimul Rivers, and throughout the final months of the war, the battalion took part in clearing the area around the Danmap, relieving the 2/4th Battalion around Idakaibul, which was secured as a patrol base before pushing the Australian line towards the east, capturing several features between there and Malin and fighting numerous small scale patrol actions. Throughout the final stages of 1944, the 2/8th established a battalion defensive position around Anamo and further patrols were sent out before the battalion moved to the mouth of the Danmap around Luain, with a detachment further inland around Idakaibul.

Early the following year, the battalion was withdrawn back to Aitape by sea from Dogreto Bay, moving into a reserve position around Tadi plantation. Later, starting in late March they moved to But by landing craft, and from there joined the advance towards Wewak, which fell on 10 May. They subsequently pushed into the Prince Alexander Range in the interior, where the last significant Japanese forces were concentrated. In late June, the 19th Brigade advanced on the position from the north, while the 17th advanced from the west. On 10 June, the battalion began preliminary actions to secure the Japanese strong hold on Mount Shiburangu. The approaches were secured over the course of a week with artillery and flamethrowers being used to help overcome the Japanese bunkers, and on 27 June the battalion assaulted the summit. Over 3,000 rounds of artillery were fired to soften up the Japanese defences, but the Australians still came up against heavy resistance, as the Japanese defenders employed salvaged aircraft machine-guns. These were outflanked by a platoon that advanced up a steep slope, attacking the Japanese left from behind and allowing the rest of 'C' Company to secure the summit. This was the battalion's final major action of the war, and cost it three killed and seven wounded. Between 44 and 70 Japanese were killed, with over 50 bunkers being destroyed.

=== Disbandment ===
The battalion's final combat operations of the war came in late July during patrol operations around Hambrauri, to the south-east of Wewau, after which they were relieved and moved back to Wewak. The fighting came to an end in mid-August 1945, after which the 2/8th was employed making improvements to camp facilities and carrying out garrison duties. In the aftermath, the 2/8th's frontage slowly shrunk as elements were returned to Australia from demobilisation based on length of service. Others who did not qualify for discharge were transferred to other units for further service. Finally, in mid-November the remaining cadre of the battalion left Wewak, and the 2/8th was subsequently disbanded on 14 December 1945, while at Puckapunyal, where their service had begun six years earlier. During its service a total of 2,793 men served with the 2/8th Battalion of whom were 77 killed, 248 were wounded and 203 were captured. Members of the battalion received the following decorations: one Distinguished Service Order, 11 Military Crosses, six Distinguished Conduct Medals, 11 Military Medals, and 53 Mentions in Despatches. In addition, one was appointed as a Member of the Order of the British Empire.

== Battle honours ==
The 2/8th received the following battle honours for its involvement in the war:

- Bardia 1941, Capture of Tobruk, Derna, Mount Olympus, Vevi, Canea, 42nd Street, Withdrawal to Sphakia, Abau–Malin, Wewak, and Mount Shiburangu – Mount Tazaki.

These honours were subsequently entrusted to the 8th Battalion in 1961, and through this link are maintained by the Royal Victoria Regiment.

== Commanding officers ==
The following officers commanded the 2/8th during the war:

- Lieutenant Colonel John Mitchell (1939–1941);
- Lieutenant Colonel Robert Winning (1941–1943); and
- Lieutenant Colonel W. Stace Howden (1943–1946).

== Notes ==
Footnotes

Citations
