= Roy King (soldier) =

Australian Army officer (1897–1965)

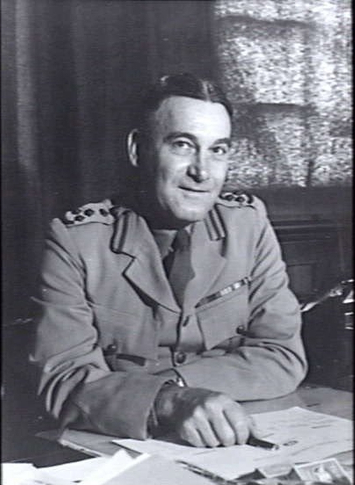
- As Director of Military Training in December 1945
- Born: 27 August 1897; Newcastle, New South Wales
- Died: 24 September 1959 (aged 62); Collaroy, New South Wales
- Military career
- Branch: Australian Army
- Service years: 1919–1954
- Rank: Major General
- Service number: NP10263; VX20315
- Commands: 2/5th Battalion; 3rd Brigade; 16th Brigade
- Conflicts: Second World War; Western Desert campaign; Greek campaign; Syria–Lebanon campaign; Aitape–Wewak campaign; Occupation of Japan; Korean War
- Awards: Commander of the Order of the British Empire; Distinguished Service Order; Mention in Despatches (2)

Roy King, CBE, DSO (27 August 1897 – 24 September 1959) was an Australian Army major general. During the Second World War he commanded the 2/5th Battalion in the Western Desert campaign, Greek campaign and Syria–Lebanon campaign and the 16th Brigade in the Aitape–Wewak campaign. After the war he was the brigadier in charge of administration and commander of the Australian military component in the Occupation of Japan. During the Korean War, he was the principal administrative officer of the British Commonwealth Occupation Force in Japan and Korea.

== Early life ==
Roy King was born in Tighes Hill, a suburb of Newcastle, New South Wales, on 27 August 1897, the fourth child of James King, a miner, and his wife Bessie, née Sharpe. He was educated at Cooks Hill Public School in Newcastle and entered the Royal Military College, Duntroon, in February 1916. He graduated in December 1919 and was commissioned as a lieutenant in the Permanent Military Forces (PMF).

== Between the wars ==
After graduation, King went to England for further training. On returning to Australia, he served in a series of staff and regimental appointments, training the Militia in south eastern Queensland. He was adjutant and quartermaster of the 42nd Battalion from 1921 to 1925, and the 26th Battalion from 1925 to 1927. While serving as a staff officer in the headquarters of the 1st Military District in Brisbane, he was honorary aide-de-camp to the Governor of Queensland from 1928 to 1929.

On 12 March 1929, King married Florence Lorna Grainger, née Reynolds, a divorcee with two sons from her first marriage, at the Albert Street Methodist Church in Brisbane. He served with the 11th Light Horse Regiment at Toowoomba from 1931 to 1934 and then with the 8th Light Horse Regiment in Benalla, Victoria, from 1934 to 1936, when he was assigned to Army Headquarters in Melbourne. He was promoted to major the following year.

== Second World War ==
Following the outbreak of the Second World War, King joined the Second Australian Imperial Force (AIF), trading in his PMF service number NP10263 for an AIF one, VX20315. In May 1940 he embarked for the Middle East as the brigade major of the 19th Brigade. He was promoted to lieutenant colonel in December 1940 and assumed command of the 2/5th Battalion the following month. He led the 2/5th Battalion in the Western Desert campaign and the Greek campaign, where his distinguished leadership during the withdrawals and rearguard actions led to his being awarded the Distinguished Service Order. After the evacuation from Greece on 26 April 1941, he led the 2/5th Battalion in the Syria–Lebanon campaign in June, notably in the Battle of Damour. He was promoted to colonel in November and joined the staff of the 7th Division. He returned to Australia in March 1942 with Operation Stepsister.

In May 1942, King was given command of the 3rd Brigade, which formed part of the Northern Territory Force, with the mission of defending Darwin against a possible Japanese invasion. On 18 February 1943, he assumed command of the 16th Brigade. Part of the 6th Division, it had just returned to Australia after participating in the Battle of Buna–Gona. The 16th Brigade trained on the Atherton Tableland in north Queensland before moving to Aitape in New Guinea, in December 1944. Over the next few months, he led the brigade in the Aitape-Wewak campaign, advancing over rugged jungle terrain and killing large numbers of Japanese in the process. In July 1945, he assumed temporary command of the 6th Division before handing over to Major General Horace Robertson in August. That month King was medically evacuated. He was made a Commander of the Order of the British Empire on 12 February 1946.

== Post-war ==
King was the Director of Military Training at Army Headquarters from 1945 to 1947, when he became the commandant of the Army Command and Staff College at Fort Queenscliff. In 1949, he went to Japan as brigadier in charge of administration and commander of the Australian Army component of the British Commonwealth Occupation Force (BCOF). With the outbreak of the Korean War in 1950, his command provided support for the British Commonwealth forces fighting in Korea. King was promoted to the temporary rank of major general in August 1951, and was appointed principal administrative officer of the BCOF in Japan and Korea.

In November 1951, King returned to Australia. He commanded the 1st Military District, based in Brisbane, from 1951 to 1952 and then the 4th Military District, based in Adelaide, from 1952 to 1954. His rank of major general became substantive on March 1952. He retired from the Army on 28 August 1954.

== Later life ==
In retirement, King lived in Sydney. He died from a coronary occlusion at his home at the Sydney suburb of Collaroy on 24 September 1959 and his remains were cremated.
