= Roy King =

Roy King may refer to:

- Roy King (artist) (1903–1986), American sculptor, painter and civil engineer.
- Roy King (soldier) (1897–1959), Australian general
- Roy Crimmins (1929–2014), English jazz trombonist, composer and arranger who used the pseudonym Roy King

== See also ==
- Don Roy King (born 1947), American television director
- Elwyn Roy King (1894–1941), fighter ace in the Australian Flying Corps during World War I
