= 2/4th Battalion (Australia) =

Infantry battalion of the Australian Army

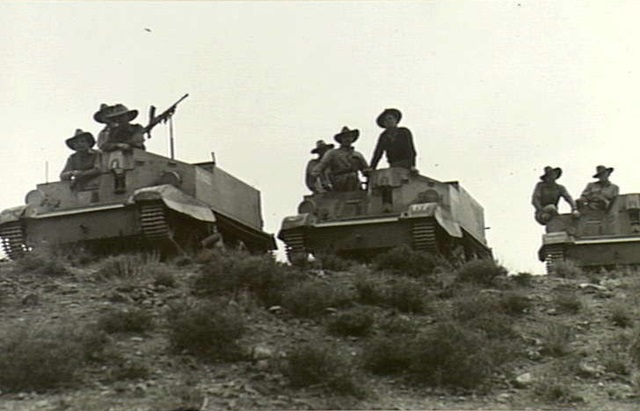
- Carriers from the 2/4th in Syria, October 1941
- Active: 1939–1945
- Country: Australia
- Branch: Australian Army
- Type: Infantry
- Size: ~800–900 all ranks (Note: By the start of World War II, the authorised strength of an Australian infantry battalion was 910 men all ranks, however, later in the war it fell to 803.)
- Part of: 19th Brigade, 6th Division
- Colours: White and green
- Engagements: World War II: North African campaign; Greek campaign; New Guinea campaign; Aitape–Wewak campaign

Insignia
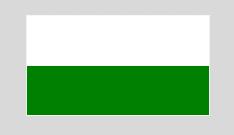
- Unit colour patch

The 2/4th Battalion was an infantry battalion of the Australian Army that was raised for service during World War II, as part of the Second Australian Imperial Force. Deploying to the Middle East in early 1940, the battalion took part in the early fighting in North Africa in early 1941 along with the rest of the 6th Division, before being sent to Greece and then Crete, where it was heavily engaged and suffered heavy losses. Rebuilt in Palestine, the battalion undertook occupation duties in Syria.

In early 1942, the 2/4th returned to Australia in response to Japan's entry into the war, and subsequently undertook a long period of defensive duties and training in Darwin, and then in north Queensland. While other elements of the 6th Division saw action in New Guinea in 1942–1943, the 2/4th saw no combat again until late in the war, when it was committed to the Aitape–Wewak campaign in late 1944, fighting throughout the remainder of the war. Following the end of hostilities, the battalion was disbanded in Australia in November 1945.

== History ==
=== Formation and training ===
The 2/4th Battalion (Note: The numerical designation of 2nd AIF units was prefixed by "2/", which was used to set them apart from Militia units with corresponding numerical designations.) was raised on 3 November 1939 at Victoria Barracks, in Sydney, as part of the all volunteer Second Australian Imperial Force (2nd AIF). Among the first batch of troops raised as part of the new force, the battalion was initially attached to the 16th Brigade, which was assigned to the 6th Division. Consisting of four rifle companies – designated 'A' to 'D' – under a headquarters company and a battalion headquarters, like other 2nd AIF infantry battalions raised at the time, the battalion had an authorised strength of around 900 personnel. The colours chosen for the battalion's unit colour patch (UCP) were the same as those of the 4th Battalion, which had been raised for service during World War I as part of the First Australian Imperial Force, and had subsequently been re-raised as Militia battalion. These colours were white over green, in a horizontal rectangular shape, although a border of grey was added to the UCP to distinguish the battalion from its Militia counterpart.

Under the command of Lieutenant Colonel Percival Parsons, a World War I veteran who had served in the Militia between the wars, the battalion began the process of training its personnel at Ingleburn, New South Wales with several instructors being attached from the Australian Instructional Corps. Many of the initial volunteers had had previous military experience in the part-time forces, with the first group of commissioned and non-commissioned officers all being sourced from New South Wales Militia battalions including the 4th, 20th/19th and 56th Battalions. Training included basic soldiering skills such as weapon handling, drill, physical fitness, navigation, anti-gas techniques and fieldcraft. Finally, by early January 1940, the battalion was deemed ready to deploy overseas and on 4 January, the 2/4th took part in a farewell march through the streets of Sydney. Less than a week later, on 10 January 1940, the battalion departed Sydney aboard Strathnaver, bound for the Middle East. Sailing via Fremantle and Colombo, the 2/4th arrived at Kantara, in Egypt, in mid-February.

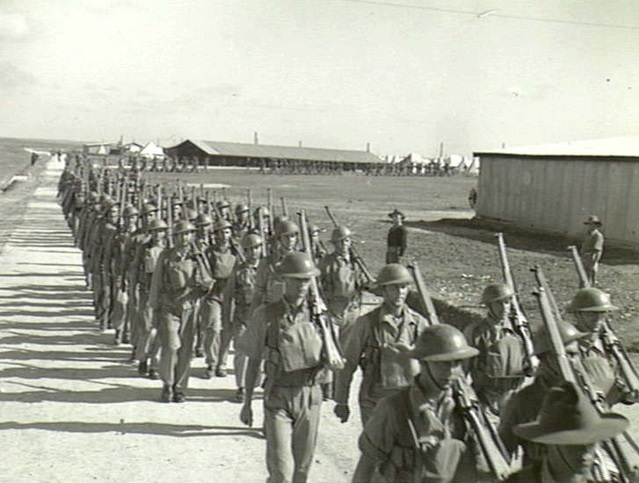
Parade at Gaza, April 1940

=== Middle East, Greece, Crete and Syria ===
Following a re-organisation of the structure of the Australian Army, which saw each infantry brigade reduced from four infantry battalions to three, the battalion was re-allocated to the 19th Brigade. This change occurred while the 2/4th was at sea, and after arriving in the Middle East, it concentrated at a camp at Kilo 89, near Gaza, in Palestine where it joined the 2/8th and 2/11th Battalions. For a brief period, following Italy's entry into the war, the battalion was converted to an anti-aircraft regiment and employed in the defence of Haifa, before it was converted back into an infantry battalion in August 1940. After rejoining the 19th Brigade, the 2/4th undertook further exercises and training in Egypt and Palestine prior to the Australians being committed to the fighting against the Italians in the Libyan desert in January 1941 during Operation Compass. A series of actions were fought by the Australians around Bardia, Tobruk and Derna, before the 2/4th entered Benghazi in February. In reserve at Bardia, the battalion's main action came around Derna. During this action, a deception plan was executed by the battalion second-in-command, Major Robert Winning, drawing Italian artillery fire into no man's land. The battalion subsequently occupied Benghazi in early February.

In April 1941, as the Allies grew concerned about a German invasion of Greece, a combined force of British, Australian and New Zealand troops were deployed there from North Africa. It was a short lived campaign, as the Germans advanced quickly, rapidly pushing the Allies back. In freezing temperatures, the 2/4th was heavily engaged around Vevi, in northern Greece near the border with Yugoslavia, but also found itself being evacuated by the end of the month, departing from Megara. A small number of the battalion was not evacuated, however. Of these, most were captured and eventually sent to prisoner of war camps, although a couple were able to make their own way through Turkey to Palestine, where they eventually returned to the battalion. Several members of the 2/4th also managed to successfully escape from German or Italian prisoner of war camps.

About 500 men from the 2/4th were evacuated by sea to Crete, arriving on 27 April. After the Germans launched an airborne invasion of the strategically important island on 20 May, the 2/4th fought around Heraklion airfield, being temporarily detached to the British 14th Infantry Brigade. During the initial landing, the German paratroopers attacking the airfield were repulsed, but they successfully managed to establish a strong foothold around the Allied position, and after heavy fighting the battalion was withdrawn from town, being taken off the Heraklion mole aboard several British destroyers as the island fell to the Germans. During the evacuation several of the warships that carried the 2/4th were subjected to heavy aerial attack, and several from the battalion were killed or wounded. After arriving in Alexandria, the battalion was rebuilt in Palestine, making up its losses from the earlier campaigns from new reinforcements in Palestine. In the wake of the Syria–Lebanon campaign, the battalion deployed to Syria as part of the Allied occupation force established there to defend against a possible German invasion through the Caucasus. They remained there until January 1942, enduring a cold and snowy winter. In the middle of the month, the 19th Brigade moved to Palestine, and from there the 2/4th embarked upon the troopship HMT Rajula at Port Tewfik, for the return to Australia, following Japan's entry into the war. Sailing via Colombo, they arrived in Fremantle in mid-March 1942, before proceeding on to Port Adelaide.

=== Home service and fighting in New Guinea ===
While other elements of the 6th Division were sent to New Guinea in late 1942 and early 1943 and saw combat against the Japanese along the Kokoda Track and around Wau, the 19th Brigade was allocated to defensive duties in Darwin, Northern Territory. Thus, after a fortnight's leave, the 2/4th Battalion, which had been temporarily headquartered around Mount Lofty in South Australia, was ordered north in late May 1942. They remained there until June 1943, when the battalion was moved to northern Queensland, along with the rest of the 19th Brigade, aboard Duntroon, as the 6th Division's other two brigades – the 16th and 17th – returned to Australia from New Guinea. As the division was brought back up to strength, a long period of training followed. Consequently, it was not until late in the war that the 2/4th was committed to its first, and only, campaign against the Japanese, deploying to Aitape–Wewak in November 1944, aboard the US transport City of Mexico, as the Australians took over from US forces in the region.

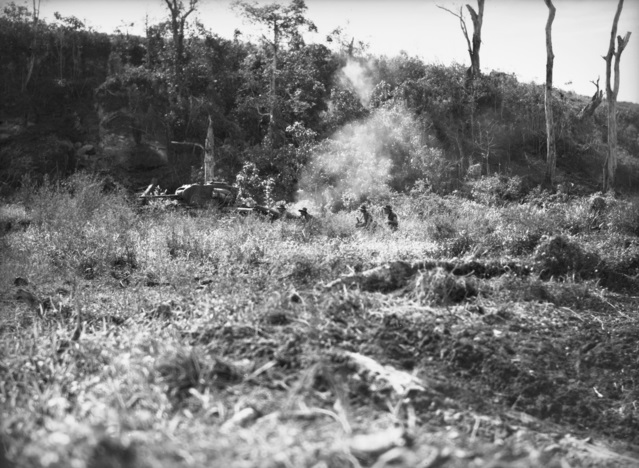
Troops from the 2/4th attack around Wewak with tank support, 10 May 1945

After establishing themselves, the 19th Brigade was initially tasked with securing the area between around the Driniumor, Danmap and Danimul Rivers, and throughout the final months of the war, the battalion undertook an amphibious landing around But, before joining the advance towards Wewak, with fighting around Matapau in late December 1944 and then around Abau and Malin in early January 1945. After Wewak fell on 10 May and the Australians began pushing into the Prince Alexander Range in the interior. Further actions were fought around the Wirui Mission in the middle of May, and then around Mount Shiburangu and Mount Tazaki in May and early July, before the fighting came to an end in August 1945.

Following the end of hostilities, the process of demobilisation began. There was a large turn over of personnel at this time. Men who were eligible for discharge began returning to Australia in drafts after September, with the first batch departing aboard Katoomba, bound for Brisbane. Those who were not eligible for discharge were transferred to other battalions for further service. By October, all that remained was a small cadre of personnel tasked with returning the battalion's equipment and obtaining the necessary clearances for the battalion's equipment accounts to be closed and records finalised. These personnel arrived in Australia in late October, and the 2/4th Battalion was subsequently disbanded at Chermside on 12 November 1945. During its service a total of 2,624 men served with the 2/4th Battalion of whom were 94 killed, 243 were wounded and 195 were captured. One of the unit's soldiers, Private Edward Kenna, received the Victoria Cross for his actions during an attack on the Wirui Mission in May 1945; in addition, members of the battalion also received the following decorations: one Distinguished Service Order, nine Military Crosses, six Distinguished Conduct Medals, 11 Military Medals, and 53 Mentions in Despatches. Two members of the 2/4th were invested as Members of the Order of the British Empire.

== Battle honours ==
The 2/4th received the following battle honours for its involvement in the war:

- Bardia 1941, Capture of Tobruk, Veve, Soter, Heraklion, Wewak, Wirui Mission, and Mount Shiburangu – Mount Tazaki.

These honours were subsequently entrusted to the 4th Battalion in 1961, and through this link are maintained by the Royal New South Wales Regiment.

== Commanding officers ==
The following officers commanded the 2/4th during the war:

- Lieutenant Colonel Percival Parsons (1939–1940);
- Lieutenant Colonel Ivan Dougherty (1940–1942);
- Lieutenant Colonel Nevis Farrell (1942–1945); and
- Lieutenant Colonel Geoffrey Cox (1945).

== Notes ==
Footnotes

Citations
