= Robert Winning =

Australian Army officer

Robert Emmett Winning
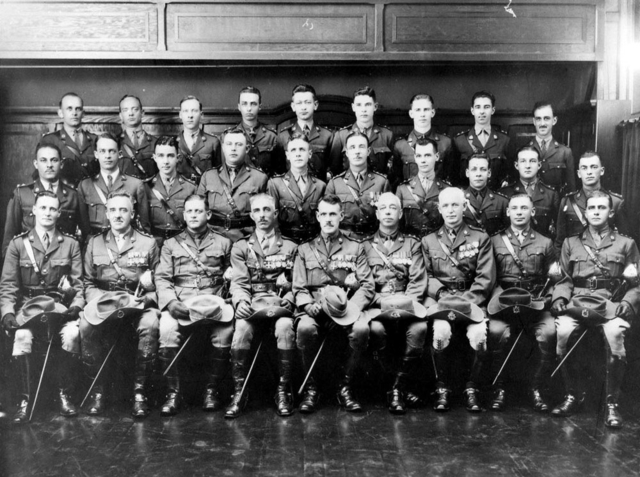
- Officers from the 1st/19th Infantry Battalion, 1932. Winning is in the back row, fifth from the left
- Born: 9 April 1906; Hurstville, Sydney
- Died: 21 November 1971 (aged 65); Watsons Bay, Sydney
- Military career
- Branch: Australian Army
- Service years: 1927–1946
- Rank: Brigadier
- Service number: NX44
- Commands: 13th Brigade; 12th Brigade; 3rd Brigade; 2/8th Battalion
- Conflicts: World War II; North African campaign; Battle of Greece; Battle of Crete; New Britain campaign
- Awards: Distinguished Service Order; Officer of the Order of the British Empire; Efficiency Decoration; Mentioned in Despatches

Brigadier Robert Emmett Winning, DSO, OBE, ED (9 April 1906 – 21 November 1971) was an Australian Army officer who commanded several units and formations during World War II. A pharmacist in civilian life, Winning was an officer in the part-time Militia during the inter-war years. He volunteered for overseas service with the Second Australian Imperial Force during World War II and fought in the Middle East, Greece and Crete in 1941. He commanded an infantry battalion in Syria on occupation duties, and in Australia, where he led the unit in a garrison role in the Northern Territory. He was promoted to brigadier in early 1943 and commanded several formations in Australia until assuming command of the 13th Brigade in the field, commanding the unit against the Japanese in the final stage of the New Britain campaign. In 1946, he returned to civilian life, working as a pharmacist. He died at the age of 65 after falling from a cliff at Watsons Bay.

== Early life and military career ==
Born in Hurstville, Sydney, on 9 April 1906, Winning was one of five children born to Robert and Elizabeth Winning. He attended Sydney Boys' High School and then the University of Sydney. He was a pharmacist in civilian life, and began his military career in the part-time Militia in 1927. His father was an ironmonger of Irish heritage who was American by birth, while his mother had been born in England. He served with the 1st/19th Infantry Battalion as a lieutenant during the early 1930s. By February 1936, Winning had reached the rank of captain.

Following the outbreak of World War II in September 1939, Winning volunteered for overseas service with the Second Australian Imperial Force and was appointed as a major in the 2/4th Infantry Battalion. He served with the battalion as a company commander, and then battalion second-in-command, fighting against the Italians in North Africa in January 1941, and then the Germans in Greece and Crete in April and May 1941. He was mentioned in despatches for his service during this period.

Winning was promoted to lieutenant colonel in July 1941 and given command of the 2/8th Infantry Battalion. This battalion had been heavily depleted by the fighting in Greece and on Crete, and was rebuilt under Winning's leadership in Palestine. In October, Winning led the 2/8th to Syria, where they undertook occupation duties until January 1942. The battalion was then brought back to Australia to prepare for actions against the Japanese in the Pacific, but was instead deployed to Darwin, Northern Territory, as garrison troops assigned to Northern Territory Force. Winning remained with the battalion until 18 February 1943.

In February 1943, Winning was promoted to brigadier and commanded the 3rd Brigade, a Militia formation, on garrison duties until April 1944. This was followed by command of the 12th Brigade until May 1945. In 1945, he led the 13th Brigade during the New Britain campaign against the Japanese, taking command of the brigade in the field after its previous commander, Brigadier Eric McKenzie, fell ill. For his services in this campaign, he later received the Distinguished Service Order (in 1947). He had earlier been appointed an Officer of the Order of the British Empire in June 1943. He also received an Efficiency Decoration.

== Later life ==
Post war, Winning relinquished his 2nd AIF appointment in 1946 and was placed on the Reserve list, returning to civilian life, initially in a factory, then as a pharmacist at St Luke's Hospital in Darlinghurst. He married Valerie Green, who was 18 years his junior, in 1955, but the couple did not have children. Winning died on 21 November 1971 after falling from a cliff around Watsons Bay, at the age of 65. He was commemorated with an Anglican service, and was cremated. In summarising his character, Winning's biographer, John Connor, wrote that he was "strong-minded and sometimes sarcastic", and that in retirement he had a "led a very private life".
