= 16th Brigade (Australia) =

Infantry brigade of the Australian Army during 1917-1946

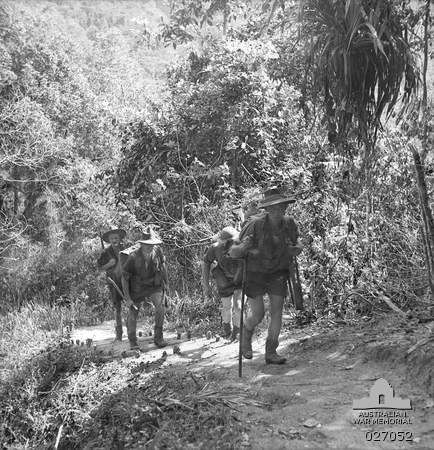
- Troops from the 16th Brigade cross the Owen Stanleys, October 1942
- Active: 1917; 1939–1946
- Country: Australia
- Branch: Army
- Type: Infantry
- Role: Anti-tank warfare Artillery observer Bayonet charge Combined arms Counter-battery fire Desert warfare Direct fire Indirect fire Jungle warfare Raiding; Reconnaissance; Tracking; Trench warfare
- Size: Brigade
- Part of: 6th Division
- Engagements: World War II: Western Desert campaign; Battle of Greece; Battle of Crete; New Guinea campaign; Kokoda Track campaign; Battle of Buna–Gona; Aitape–Wewak campaign

Commanders
- Notable commanders: Kenneth Eather

Insignia
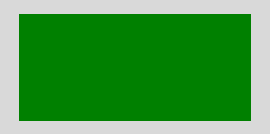
- Headquarters unit colour patch

The 16th Brigade was an infantry brigade in the Australian Army. First raised in 1912 as a Militia formation to provide training under the compulsory training scheme, the brigade was later re-raised as part of the First Australian Imperial Force during World War I. Its existence was short-lived, as it was disbanded after about six months, before it could be committed to the fighting on the Western Front. Raised again in 1939 for service during World War II, the brigade was deployed to the Middle East in early 1940 and subsequently saw action in the Western Desert campaign and in Battle of Greece in 1941. In 1942, it returned to Australia in response to Japan's entry into the war, and later the brigade played a prominent role in the Kokoda Track campaign and at Buna–Gona in Papua. Withdrawn to Australia in early 1943, the 16th Brigade was re-organised and received many replacements from disbanding formations, but it was not recommitted to combat operations until late in the war. In 1944–1945, the brigade was committed to the Aitape–Wewak campaign in New Guinea. After the war, the brigade was disbanded in 1946. Today, its name is perpetuated by the 16th Aviation Brigade which was raised on 2 April 2002.

== History ==
=== Pre-war years ===
In 1912, when Australian introduced the compulsory training scheme, a total of 23 Militia brigades, mostly of four battalions, were planned for. These were assigned to six military districts around Australia. At this time, the 16th Brigade formed part of the 3rd Military District. The brigade's constituent units had training depots in various locations around southern Victoria, including Newmarket, North Melbourne, South Carlton, Collingwood, Fitzroy, East Melbourne and Footscray. The brigade's constituent battalions were sequentially numbered: 61st, 62nd, 63rd and 64th.

=== World War I ===
During World War I, the brigade was briefly re-formed as part of the all volunteer First Australian Imperial Force (AIF). Following a request from the British to raise another division to complement the five already deployed on the Western Front, the 16th Infantry Brigade was formed in England, in the Salisbury Plain Training Area, as part of the 6th Division on 17 March 1917. The brigade was formed mainly from convalescents who were in Britain recovering. The unit did not see any action and was disbanded in September following the Battle of Bullecourt and Battle of Messines due to manpower shortages in the AIF. After this, the brigade's personnel were transferred to the AIF's Overseas Training Brigade with the last elements departing on 19 October 1917. The brigade's machine gun company was later re-designated as the 23rd Machine Gun Company and eventually allocated to the 3rd Machine Gun Battalion, going to serve as part of the 3rd Division. Only 15 infantry brigades were raised as part of the Militia during the interwar years, so the 16th Brigade was not re-raised during this time.

=== World War II ===
The 16th Infantry Brigade was reformed on 13 October 1939, again as part of the 6th Division. After its headquarters was opened at Victoria Barracks, in Paddington, New South Wales, the brigade moved to Ingleburn the following month. Consisting of four infantry battalions – the 2/1st, 2/2nd, 2/3rd and 2/4th – the brigade was the first raised as part of the all volunteer Second Australian Imperial Force (2nd AIF). After rudimentary training, the brigade embarked for the Middle East in January 1940, reaching Julis, in Palestine, the following month. The brigade was reduced to three battalions in May, as the Australian Army was reorganised to replicate the British Army's brigade structure. This saw the 2/4th Battalion being transferred to the 19th Brigade. Training continued during this time until the 16th Brigade moved to Helwan in Egypt, where they received the remainder of their equipment. Divisional exercises took place in October and November, after which the 6th Division was deployed to Libya.

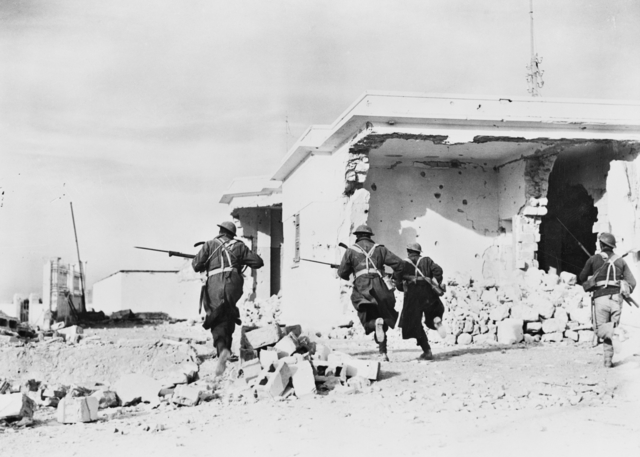
Troops from the 2/2nd Battalion attacking Bardia, January 1941

In January 1941, the brigade was committed to the Western Desert Campaign, going into action for the first time around Bardia, which was captured from the Italians over several days. This was followed later in the month by the capture of Tobruk, where the 16th Brigade remained while the 6th Division's other two brigades, the 17th and 19th, took part in other actions around Derna and Benghazi. In March, the division concentrated around Amiriya as they prepared to deploy to Greece, in response to an expected German invasion. During the Battle of Greece, the 16th Brigade occupied Seria before establishing itself in the Veria Pass. As the German attack began, the 2/1st Battalion provided rearguard cover while the brigade withdrew alongside the New Zealand 4th Brigade. A German breakthrough at Tempe Gorge resulted in a further withdrawal during which the 2/2nd and 2/3rd Battalions provided rearguard security as Anzac Corps withdrew through Larissa. After this, the brigade was ordered to evacuate, and elements were withdrawn by sea at Kalamata. The majority of the brigade was evacuated back to Egypt and subsequently re-formed in Palestine; however, elements of the brigade landed on Crete. The 2/1st was landed as a whole and deployed to defend the airfield at Retimo, while elements of the 2/2nd and 2/3rd were formed into a 16th Brigade Composite Battalion. During the fighting, the 2/1st was largely destroyed during the brief Battle of Crete, with the majority being taken prisoner.

The 2/1st Battalion was re-raised in June 1941, in Palestine; meanwhile, the 2/3rd Battalion was detached from the brigade to take part in the Syria–Lebanon campaign, serving with the 17th Brigade. During this time, the 2/6th and 2/7th Battalions briefly came under the brigade's command. Throughout the latter part of 1941, the 16th Brigade undertook garrison duty in Egypt and then later in Syria. In early 1942, following Japan's entry into the war, the Australian government requested that the 6th Division be returned to Australia and in February the brigade moved to Beit Jirja, in Palestine, prior to embarkation. En route, the 16th and 17th Brigades were diverted to Ceylon where they were landed to defend against a possible Japanese invasion. The 16th Brigade defended an area around Horana until July 1942, when they completed the voyage back to Australia, which was completed by August.

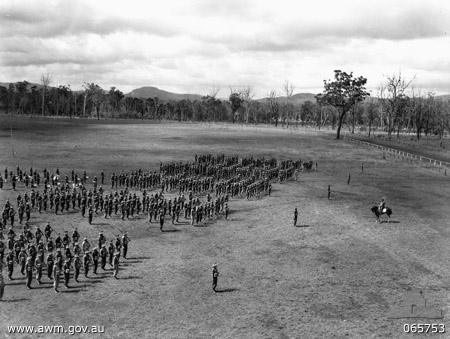
Troops from the 2/1st Battalion at Wondecla, Queensland, April 1944

A period of leave followed, after which the brigade concentrated at Wallgrove, New South Wales. The following month, as the Japanese continued their advance towards Port Moresby, the 16th Brigade was hastily committed to defend the town. The Japanese advance was subsequently held at Imita Ridge, and as the strategic situation turned against them, they began to withdraw. In October, the 16th Brigade joined the 25th in a pursuit towards Kokoda. Their first action came around Eora Creek, after which the brigade bypassed Kokoda, which was captured by the 25th Brigade, as the Australians turned their advance north towards Wairopi. The brigade's next action came around Oivi–Gorari. As the majority of the brigade attacked the Japanese around Oivi, the 2/1st Battalion was detached and carried out a flanking manoeuvre with the 25th Brigade to assault the Japanese rear around Gorari. The brigade continued its advance towards the Japanese northern beachheads, coming up against strongly entrenched positions around Sanananda. Heavily depleted by disease and casualties, by December 1942, the 16th Brigade was withdrawn by air back to Port Moresby before returning to Australia in January 1943.

The brigade's personnel were granted a period of leave before they reconstituted at Wondecla on the Atherton Tablelands, in Queensland. A long period of training in Australia followed during which time a large batch of reinforcements was received from the 30th Brigade, which was disbanded. During this time, the role of Australian troops in the Pacific declined, as the US took over the main Allied effort. As a result, it was not until the final stages of the war that the 16th Brigade returned to combat operations. In December 1944, the brigade was committed to the Aitape–Wewak campaign in New Guinea, when the Australians took over from US forces, which had established a base at Aitape, where they joined the rest of the 6th Division in an advance towards Wewak and then into the Torricelli Range. A series of patrol and small-scale actions followed as the Australians secured the area throughout 1944 and into 1945. Following the conclusion of hostilities in August 1945, the 16th Brigade concentrated around Dallman Harbour. Here, the demobilisation process began shortly afterwards, with drafts of personnel being returned based on priority. Meanwhile, personnel undertook parades and occupation duties, overseeing the surrender of Japanese personnel. In October, elements of the 2/2nd Battalion were sent to Merauke, amidst concerns of an Indonesian uprising. Other activities included vocational education and training, and sports, to keep the troops occupied as they awaited repatriation to Australia. The brigade was disbanded in mid-November, and its remaining personnel returned to Australia for demobilisation.

In the post war era, the 16th Brigade was not re-raised. Its numerical designation is perpetuated, though, by the 16th Aviation Brigade which was raised on 2 April 2002.

== Units ==
The following units were assigned to the brigade during World War I:

- 61st Battalion (19 March 1917 – 19 October 1917)
- 65th Battalion (19 March 1917 – 16 May 1917)
- 69th Battalion (19 March 1917 – 19 October 1917)
- 70th Battalion (19 March 1917 – 16 May 1917)
- 62nd Battalion (17 May 1917 – 16 September 1917)
- 63rd Battalion (17 May 1917 – 19 October 1917)
- 16th Machine Gun Company (7 June 1917 – 16 August 1917)
- 16th Light Trench Mortar Battery (5 June 1917 – 26 September 1917)

The following units were assigned to the brigade during World War II:

- 2/1st Battalion (16 October 1939 – December 1945)
- 2/2nd Battalion (24 October 1939 – 15 February 1946)
- 2/3rd Battalion (24 October 1939 – 8 February 1946)
- 2/4th Battalion (3 November 1939 – 30 April 1940) to 19th Brigade

== Commanders ==
The following officers commanded the brigade during World War I:

- Brigadier General John Antill (20 March 1917 – 20 September 1917)
- Lieutenant Colonel William Mackenzie (20 September 1917 – 19 October 1918)

The following officers commanded the brigade during World War II:

- Brigadier Arthur Allen (1939–1940)
- Lieutenant Colonel George Wootten (1940)
- Lieutenant Colonel Kenneth Eather (1941)
- Brigadier Allan Boase (1941–1942)
- Brigadier John Edward Lloyd (1942–1943)
- Brigadier Roy King (1943–1945)
