= 19th Brigade (Australia) =

Infantry brigade of the Australian Army during World War II

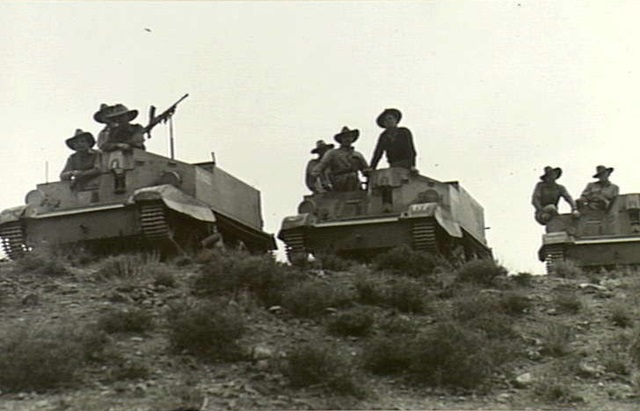
- Troops from the 2/4th Battalion in Syria, October 1941
- Active: 1940–1945
- Country: Australia
- Allegiance: Australian Crown
- Branch: Australian Army
- Type: Infantry
- Size: ~3,500 personnel
- Part of: 6th Division

Commanders
- Notable commanders: Horace Robertson; George Vasey

Insignia
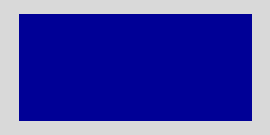
- Headquarters unit colour patch

The 19th Brigade was a formation of the Australian Army that was raised as part of the Second Australian Imperial Force for service during World War II. It was briefly raised in 1912 as a Militia formation providing training as part of the compulsory training scheme. Later, during World War II, the brigade was established in April 1940 in Palestine as a triangular formation, the brigade was created by transferring one infantry battalion from three other brigades. It was subsequently assigned to the 6th Division. Throughout 1941, the brigade fought in North Africa, Greece and on Crete, before undertaking garrison duties in Syria, remaining there until January 1942. Following the Japanese entry into the war, the 19th Brigade was withdrawn to Australia and subsequently undertook garrison duties in Darwin. It did not see combat again until late in the war, when it was committed to the Aitape–Wewak campaign in 1944–1945. The brigade was disbanded in December 1945 in Puckapunyal.

== History ==
The 19th Brigade briefly existed as Militia brigade that was partially formed in 1912, following the introduction of the compulsory training scheme. At this time, it was assigned to the 4th Military District. The brigade's constituent units were spread across various locations in South Australia including Unley, Mount Gambier, Glenelg, Hindmarsh, West Adelaide, Port Adelaide, Semaphore and East Adelaide. The formation was short lived, and was not raised as part of the First Australian Imperial Force (AIF) during the First World War. It remained on the order of battle as a Militia formation during the war, but was not re-raised in the interwar years when the Militia was reorganised to replicate the numerical designations of the AIF in 1921.

The 19th Brigade was formed in April 1940 at Qastina, in Palestine, when the Second Australian Imperial Force (2nd AIF) was reorganised and the composition of Australian infantry brigades was changed from four infantry battalions to three, to replicate the British Army brigade establishment since 1918. In creating the brigade, it was proposed that the fourth battalion from the first three 2nd AIF brigades – the 16th, 17th and 18th – be transferred to the new brigade. Transport problems led to the third battalion of the 18th Brigade, which was in Palestine, joining the brigade instead of the 2/12th Battalion, which was in Britain. On formation, the brigade consisted of the 2/4th, 2/8th and 2/11th Battalions. It was assigned to the 6th Division, replacing the 18th Brigade, which had been sent to the United Kingdom to bolster the garrison there following the Fall of France.

The first commander was Brigadier Horace Robertson, who joined from Australia. The new brigade was based at "Kilo 89" in Palestine before concentrating with the rest of the 6th Division at Borg El Arab in Egypt, where an intensive period of collective training, including divisional level exercises where undertaken, prior to the brigade commencing combat operations. During these exercises, the 19th Brigade assumed a defensive role while the 16th and 17th Brigades practised assault techniques. The following month, the 6th Division was sent to the Libyan border and in January 1941 they captured Bardia, during which the 19th Brigade was divisional reserve and played only a limited role, reinforcing the 17th Brigade in mopping up operations to the south of the fortress. The brigade played a more prominent role in the capture of Tobruk, moving through a gap created by the 16th Brigade, to attack the port area. Later, they joined the advance on Derna and then Benghazi, after which they were withdrawn to Ikingi Maryut for rest.

In March 1941, Brigadier George Vasey assumed command of the brigade after Robertson fell ill. The 6th Division then took part in the short-lived Greek campaign. The 19th Brigade arrived at Piraeus on 3 April and began moving to Kozani. Following the German invasion of Greece, the brigade fought a series of unsuccessful actions, firstly at Vevi, as the Germans steadily advanced through the country, pushing the Allies back. The brigade was bolstered by the attachment of a battalion of the Kings Royal Rifle Corps and later the New Zealand 26th Battalion. On 24 April, the brigade fought a delaying action against German mountain troops in the Brallos Pass, before they were evacuated by sea from Megara the following day. The 19th Brigade was transported to Crete, where they formed part of a hastily established garrison of British, Australian, New Zealand and Greek troops. The Battle of Crete began on 20 May 1941, in which the 19th Brigade fought around Canea, before the 2/8th Battalion took part in a counter-attack at 42nd Street before the majority of the brigade was evacuated from Sfakia.

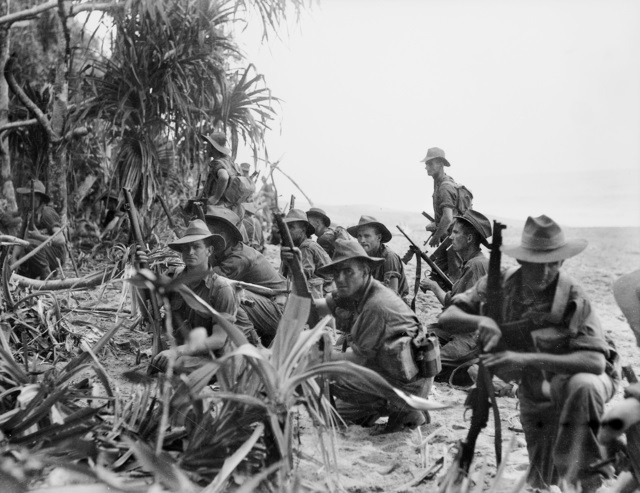
Troops from the 19th Brigade cross the Danmap River in New Guinea, 1945

Withdrawn to Egypt, the brigade concentrated around Khassa in Palestine and then moved to Julius in June, until October 1941, when they were allocated to garrison duties in Syria following the conclusion of the Syria–Lebanon campaign. Brigadier James Martin took command of the brigade from December 1941 and for the rest of the war. In early 1942, following the Japanese entry into the war, the brigade was withdrawn from Syria and returned to Palestine. From there, it returned to Australia and became part of the Darwin garrison force.

In Darwin, the brigade defended against a possible Japanese invasion. In April 1942, the 2/11th Battalion was detached from the brigade and sent to its home state of Western Australia; its place in the brigade was taken by a Militia unit, the 23rd/21st Battalion, which had been raised in Victoria in May 1942; the 2/11th Battalion rejoined the brigade in July 1943. While the 16th and 17th brigades from the 6th Division took part in some of the early campaigns in the Pacific, including the Kokoda Track campaign and the Salamaua–Lae campaign, the 19th Brigade remained in Australia and had to wait three-and-a-half years before returning to action. In June 1943, the brigade was relieved around Darwin by the 12th Brigade and moved to the Atherton Tablelands in Queensland and amphibious training was undertaken in November. In late 1944, the brigade was committed to the Aitape–Wewak campaign in New Guinea, as the Australians relieved US forces around Aitape.

The 19th Brigade arrived in October 1944, before the other Australian brigades and with the 16th Brigade, began a general advance along the coast towards Wewak, alternating between offensive operations and maintaining the defensive perimeter around Aitape. In December 1944 and January 1945, the 19th Brigade pushed across the Danmap River before being relieved. They resumed the advance in May from the Hawain River and by June 1945, the brigade had linked up with Farida Force and Wewak had been taken. The 19th Brigade went on the defensive around the base, as the Australians began penetrating towards the southern ranges, fighting actions around Mount Shiburangu and then Mount Tazaki. In July, the 8th Brigade relieved the 19th, although elements from the 2/11th Battalion continued to patrol around Boram Airfield until the 2/3rd Machine Gun Battalion arrived; at war's end in August 1945, the brigade was located around Wewak. Demobilisation began almost immediately but a shortage of shipping kept the brigade overseas for several months after the end of hostilities. In mid-November 1945, the brigade's cadre staff embarked upon the SS Ormiston and sailed via Finschhafen and Port Moresby to Brisbane, where they were allocated camp facilities around Chermside where demobilisation continued. At the end of the month, the remaining personnel moved to Puckapunyal, Victoria, where final disbandment was completed around 14 December 1945.

== Units ==
The following units were assigned to the 19th Brigade:

- 2/4th Battalion from the 16th Brigade
- 2/8th Battalion from the 17th Brigade
- 2/11th Battalion from the 18th Brigade
- 23rd/21st Battalion (14 May 1942 – 25 June 1943)

== Commanders ==
The following officers commanded the 19th Brigade:

- Brigadier Horace Robertson (April 1940 – March 1941)
- Brigadier George Vasey (March–December 1941)
- Brigadier James Martin (December 1941 – November 1945)

== See also ==
- List of Australian Army brigades
