= 2/11th Battalion (Australia) =

Infantry battalion of the Australian Army during World War II

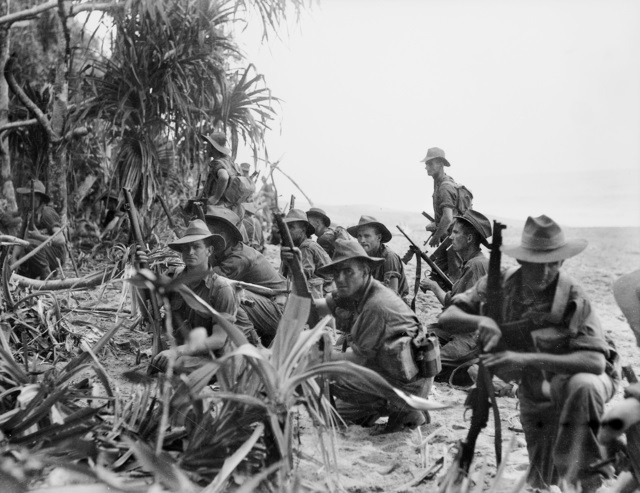
- Members of the 2/11th Battalion resting near the Danmap River in January 1945
- Active: 13 October 1939 – 7 December 1945
- Country: Australia
- Branch: Army
- Type: Infantry
- Size: ~800–900 officers and men
- Part of: 19th Brigade, 6th Division
- Colours: Brown over light blue
- Engagements: World War II: North African campaign; Greece; Crete; Syrian campaign; New Guinea campaign; Aitape–Wewak campaign

Insignia
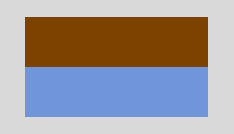
- Unit colour patch

The 2/11th Battalion was an infantry battalion of the Australian Army which saw service during World War II. Raised shortly after the outbreak of war in 1939, the 2/11th was formed from Second Australian Imperial Force volunteers who were recruited mainly from the state of Western Australia. Assigned to the 6th Division, the 2/11th completed its training in Western Australia and New South Wales before deploying to the Middle East in 1940. Its first action came around Bardia in early January 1941, and this was followed by further actions in Libya, and then Greece and on Crete during which the 2/11th suffered heavy losses. After being re-formed, in late 1941 the battalion was deployed to Syria to undertake garrison duties there. In early 1942, it was brought back to Australia to help bolster the country's defences following Japanese advances in the Pacific, and it subsequently undertook defensive duties in Western Australia. The 2/11th did not see combat again until the final year of the war when it was committed to the Aitape–Wewak campaign. It was disbanded after the war in late 1945.

== History ==
Raised at Northam, Western Australia, on 13 October 1939, the 2/11th Battalion formed part of the 6th Division of the all volunteer Second Australian Imperial Force, which was raised for service overseas at the start of the war. The majority of its personnel were recruited from Western Australia, and the battalion was the only infantry battalion of the 6th Division raised outside of New South Wales or Victoria. The colours chosen for the battalion's unit colour patch (UCP) were the same as those of the 11th Battalion, a unit which had served during World War I before being raised as a Militia formation in 1921. These colours were brown over light blue, in a horizontal rectangular shape, although a border of gray was added to the UCP to distinguish the battalion from its Militia counterpart.

With an authorised strength of around 900 personnel, like other Australian infantry battalions of the time, the battalion was formed around a nucleus of four rifle companies – designated 'A' through to 'D' – each consisting of three platoons. After completing rudimentary training at Northam in November, the battalion moved to Greta, New South Wales, where it was concentrated with the other three battalions of the 18th Brigade, which formed part of the 6th Division. The 2/11th remained in New South Wales until March when it returned to the west and subsequently departed from Fremantle, bound for the Middle East.

After arriving in Egypt further training was undertaken there and in Palestine. The battalion was later re-allocated to the 19th Brigade after the Australian brigades were reorganised into "triangular" three battalion formations. In early January 1941, the 2/11th saw action during the Battle of Bardia, fighting against Italian forces in Libya. Further actions followed later in the month around Tobruk and Derna, and then around Benghazi the following month.

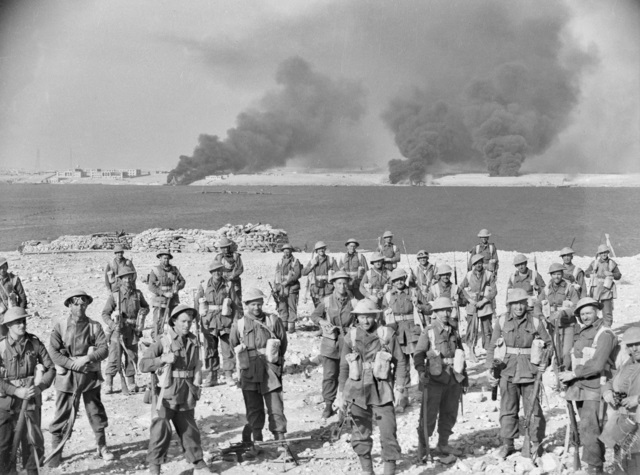
The Australian 2/11th Infantry Battalion regroups on the escarpment at the south side of Tobruk harbour, after penetrating the Italian outer defences and attacking anti-aircraft positions, 22 January 1941.

In April 1941, the battalion fought a brief and unsuccessful campaign in Greece, and then on Crete the following month. On Crete, the battalion was heavily engaged while attempting to defend Retimo airfield and a large number of the battalion's personnel were killed or captured. As a result of the casualties suffered in Greece and Crete, the battalion was virtually destroyed and the 2/11th had to be rebuilt in Palestine at the end of 1941, before joining the Allied garrison that had been established in Syria following the conclusion of the Syria–Lebanon Campaign. It was brought back to Australia in early 1942, after the Australian government decided to transfer the bulk of Australia's ground forces from the Middle East to the Pacific to meet the threat posed by Japanese forces which were advancing rapidly through the Pacific.

After landing in Adelaide in March, the 2/11th was attached to the 2nd Brigade, a formation made up largely of soldiers from the Militia, carrying out defensive duties in Western Australia. The battalion was transferred back to the 19th Brigade in Queensland in July 1943, and in late 1944 was committed to the Aitape–Wewak campaign. A mopping up operation, the campaign was one of a series of patrols and advances: at the start of the campaign in January 1945, the 2/11th were assigned to an area on the eastern bank of the Danmap River and as the campaign progressed advanced south of Wewak, moving into the Prince Alexander Mountains throughout April and May and into July 1945. At the conclusion of hostilities in August 1945, the battalion's personnel were sent back to Australia for demobilisation in small groups until mid-November when the cadre received passage home. The remaining personnel of the 2/11th subsequently concentrated at Puckapunyal where the battalion was disbanded on 7 December 1945.

During the war a total of 2,939 men served with the 2/11th Battalion which suffered 489 casualties, of whom 182 were killed. Its members received the following decorations: two Distinguished Service Orders, six Military Crosses, four Distinguished Conduct Medals, 20 Military Medals and 66 Mentions in Despatches. In addition, one member of the battalion was appointed as an Officer of the Order of the British Empire, and three were invested as Members of the Order of the British Empire.

== Battle honours ==
The 2/11th received the following battle honours for its involvement in the war:

- North Africa, Bardia 1941, Capture of Tobruk, Derna, Greece 1941, Brallos Pass, Middle East 1941–1944, Crete, Retimo, Matapau, Abau–Malin, Wewak, Wirui Mission, South-West Pacific 1942–1945, Liberation of Australian New Guinea.

These honours were subsequently entrusted to the 11th Battalion in 1961, and through this link are maintained by the Royal Western Australia Regiment.

== Commanding officers ==
The following officers commanded the 2/11th Battalion:

- Lieutenant Colonel Thomas Louch (1939–1941);
- Lieutenant Colonel Raymond Sandover (1941–1943);
- Lieutenant Colonel Hector Binks (1943–1945);
- Lieutenant Colonel Charles Green (1945).
