= Action at Mechili =

Military engagement between British and Italian forces during World War II

- Part of Operation Compass, during the Second World War
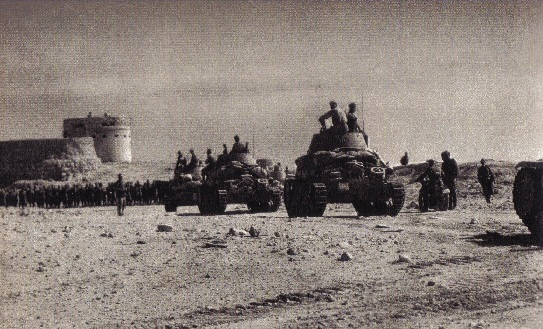
- Italian tanks with Fort Mechili in the background.
| Date | 24 January 1941 |
| Location | Mechili, Libya 32°11′00″N 22°16′00″E |
| Result | British victory |

Belligerents
| United Kingdom | Italy |

Commanders and leaders
| Richard O'Connor; Michael O'Moore Creagh | Rodolfo Graziani; Giuseppe Tellera †; Valentino Babini |

Strength
| 145 tanks | 5,000 men 129 tanks 25 tankettes 6 armoured cars 84 guns |

Casualties and losses
| 7 tanks destroyed | 9 tanks destroyed |
- Ras el-Mechili, Libya

The action at Mechili was an engagement between units of the British 7th Armoured Division of the Western Desert Force and Italian forces of the 10th Army during Operation Compass.

The Italian Army redeemed itself from the campaign's previous disastrous fiascoes. The previous British advantages in reconnaissance, maneuver, and artillery support were greatly reduced due to the British supply shortages in fuel and artillery ammunition, the battle field was now hilly and broken terrain, and they had not yet set up forward air fields. The Italian army positioned well, set up effective fields of fire, maneuvered well, had successful local counter-attacks, and inflicted casualties commensurate with what they received. They delayed the British for days, and retreated in good order with lively and effective rearguard actions.

At the coast the British pursued West along the Via Balbia and inland pursued WSW to cut the Italian retreat at the Battle of Beda Fomm.

== Background ==
After the fall of Bardia (5 January 1941) and Tobruk (22 January), Middle Eastern Command tried to destroy the remainder of the 10th Army, which was retreating from Cyrenaica. The 6th Australian Infantry Division headed towards Derna along the Via Balbia, while the 7th Armoured Division was sent into the backcountry, along the Trigh Capuzzo track, towards Fort Capuzzo and Mechili.

The 6th Australian Division was temporarily halted at Derna by the 60th Infantry Division "Sabratha" reinforced by the Libyan paratrooper battalion Ascari del Cielo and reserve units, while the 7th Armoured Division approached Mechili, a crossroads of some tactical importance; its capture would enable the British to attempt an outflanking manoeuvre against the 10th Army as it retreated along the Via Balbia and cut it off.

== Prelude ==
The Italian forces defending Mechili consisted of the Babini Group, the Piana Motorised Group and the Bignami Column. The Babini Group comprised 138 officers, 2,200 men (which included the 10th Bersaglieri Regiment), fifty-seven M13/40 medium tanks, twenty-five L3/35 tankettes, six armoured cars, eight 75 mm guns, eight 100 mm guns, eight 47 mm guns, sixteen machine guns (twelve Fiat 1935s and four 12,7 mm machine guns), seven Solothurn anti-tank rifles, six mortars, thirty flamethrowers, ninety light trucks, 160 heavy trucks and 180 motorcycles. The Piana Group was composed of 121 officers, 2,241 men, twelve 105/28 mm guns, twenty-four 75/27 mm guns, twelve 65/17 mm guns, sixteen Fiat 35 machine guns, eighteen 45 mm mortars, ten flamethrowers, 115 light trucks, 83 heavy trucks and 120 motorcycles. The Bignami Column was composed of the XXV and XXVII Bersaglieri Motorized Battalions, a group of twelve 75/27 mm guns detached from the 25th Infantry Division "Bologna" and the VI and XXI Tank Battalions, with thirty-seven M13/40 tanks each; the Piana Group and the Bignami Column were kept in reserve.

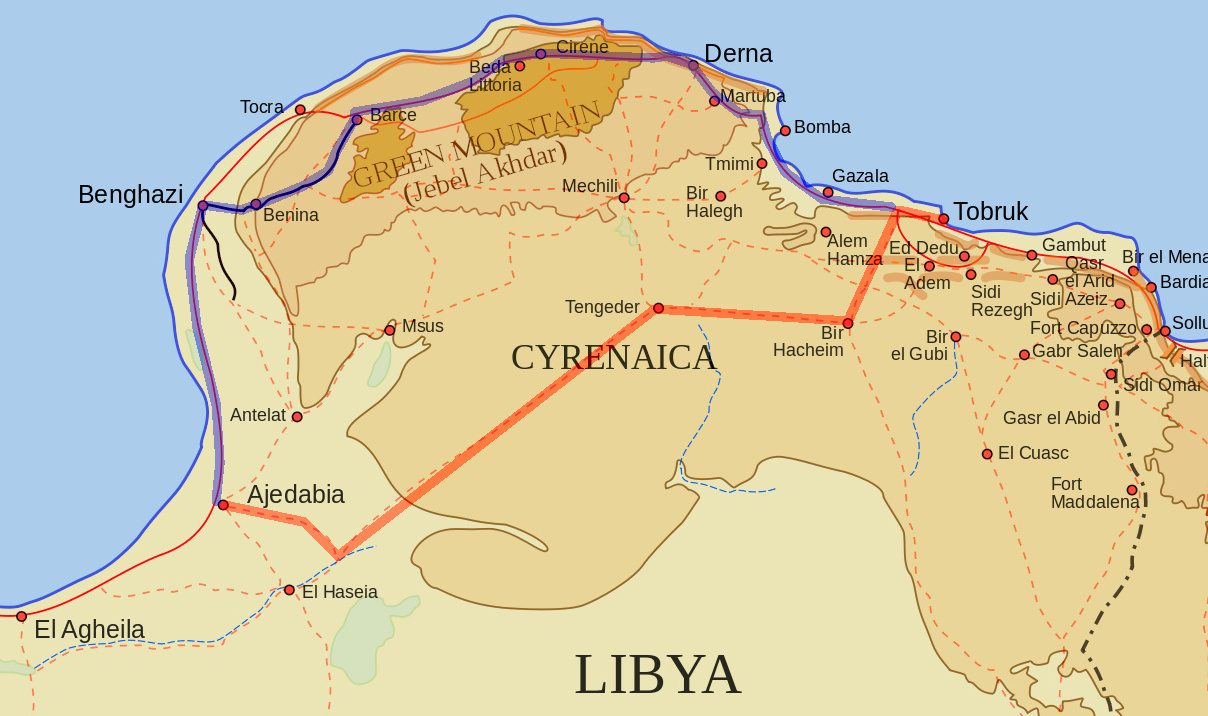
Tobruk–Agedabia, 1940–1941

The 7th Armoured Division had 50 Cruiser tanks and 95 Light Tanks Mk VI. The vanguard of the division was the 4th Armoured Brigade, with the 3rd Hussars (equipped with 25 light tanks and nine cruiser tanks), the 7th Hussars (26 Mk VI and one cruiser) and the 2nd Royal Tank Regiment (six Mk VI, three Cruiser Mk I, seven Cruiser Mk II and eleven Cruiser Mk III). The area east of the Jebel Akhdar mountains was garrisoned by XX Corps (Lieutenant-General Annibale Bergonzoli) with the 60th Infantry Division "Sabratha" and the Babini Group, which had 120 tanks. The tank force included 82 new M13/40 tanks, which needed ten days to be made battle-worthy but had been rushed forward anyway. The Sabratha held a line from Derna, along Wadi Derna to Mechili, with the Babini Group at Mechili, Giovanni Berta and Chaulan, guarding the flank and rear of the infantry. Unlike Tobruk and Bardia, Derna had not been subjected to bombing before the attack.

== Battle ==
On 23 January, the newly promoted 10th Army commander, General Giuseppe Tellera ordered a counter-attack against the British, to avoid an envelopment of XX Corps from the south. On 24 January the Babini Group, with ten to fifteen new M13/40 tanks, attacked the 7th Hussars as they headed west to cut the Derna–Mechili track north of Mechili. The British swiftly retired, calling for help from the 2nd RTR, which complacently ignored the signals. The British lost several tanks and knocked out two M.13s, until eventually, the 2nd RTR mobilised, caught the Italian tanks while they were sky-lined on a ridge and knocked out seven M.13s, for the loss of a cruiser and six light tanks.

On 25 January in the north, the 2/11th Australian Battalion engaged the "Sabratha" Division and the 10th Bersaglieri Regiment of the Babini Group at Derna airfield, making slow progress against determined resistance. Italian bombers and fighters flew sorties against the 2/11th Australian Battalion as it attacked the airfield and high ground at Siret el Chreiba. The 10th Bersaglieri swept the flat ground with field artillery and machine-guns, stopping the Australian advance 3,000 yd (1.7 mi; 2.7 km) short of the objective. The 4th Armoured Brigade was ordered to encircle Mechili and cut the western and north-western exits, while the 7th Armoured Brigade cut the road from Mechili to Slonta but the Babini Group had slipped away from Mechili during the night. The group retreated south of Slonta to Bir Melez and Antelat, covering 140 mi (220 km) through sandstorms and air attacks, pursued by the 4th Armoured Brigade until it had to stop on the 28 January due to lack of fuel, exhaustion and the camel tracks turning to deep mud in the rains.

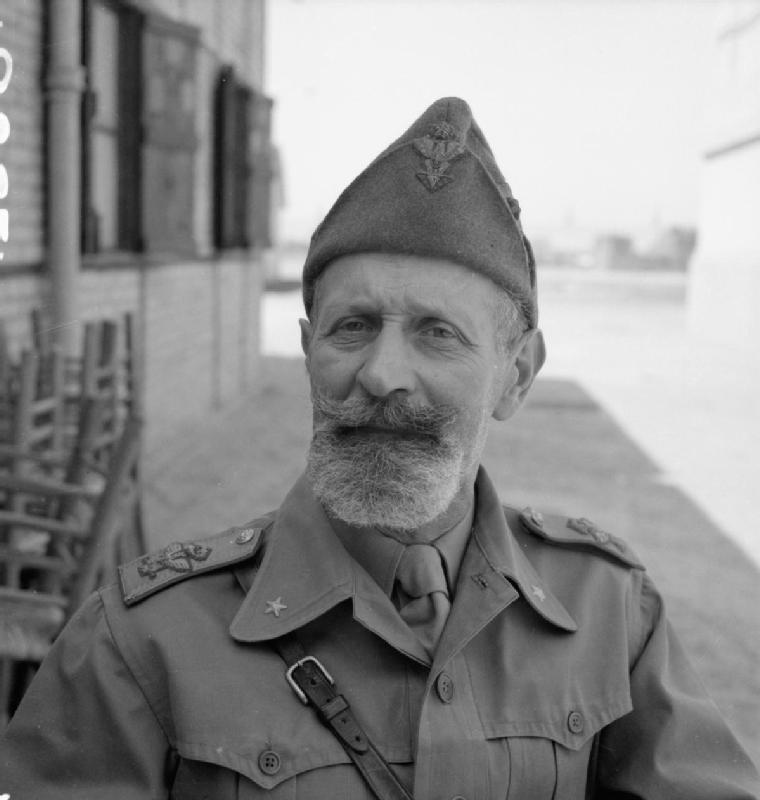
Generale Annibale Bergonzoli

On 26 January, Graziani ordered Tellera to continue the defence of Derna and to use the Babini Group to stop an advance westwards from the Mechili–Derna area. Tellera requested more tanks but this was refused until the defences of Derna began to collapse the next day. During the day, the 2/4th Australian Battalion in the Derna–Giovanni Berta area, attacked and cut the Derna–Mechili road and a company crossed Wadi Derna during the night against bold Italian counter-attacks. On the northern edge of the wadi, a determined counter-attack with artillery support was made across open ground by the 10th Bersaglieri of the Babini Group, which, with reports in the morning that the group was attacking round the southern flank, deterred the Australians from continuing the advance on Derna but cost 40 Bersaglieri killed and 56 captured.

During 27 January, Australian attempts to attack were met by massed artillery-fire, against which the Australian artillery were rationed to ten rounds per-gun per-day; the 2/4th Australian Battalion repulsed another battalion-strength counter-attack. A column of Bren carriers of the 6th Australian Cavalry Regiment was sent south to reconnoitre the area where the Italian tanks had been reported and was ambushed by a party of the Babini Group with concealed anti-tank guns and machine-guns; four Australians were killed and three taken prisoner. On 28 January, the 11th Hussars found a gap at Chaulan, south of Wadi Derna, that threatened the Babini Group and the defenders in Derna with encirclement; General Annibale Bergonzoli ordered a retirement. The Italians disengaged on the night of 28/29 January, before the garrison was trapped; rearguards of the Babini Group cratered roads, planted mines and booby-traps and managed to conduct several skilful ambushes, which slowed the British pursuit. Derna was occupied unopposed on 29 January and the Australians began a pursuit along the Via Balbia, closing on Giovanni Berta during 31 January.

== See also ==
- List of British military equipment of World War II
- List of Italian military equipment in World War II
