= Second Australian Imperial Force in the United Kingdom =

Australian unit stationed in the UK during WWII

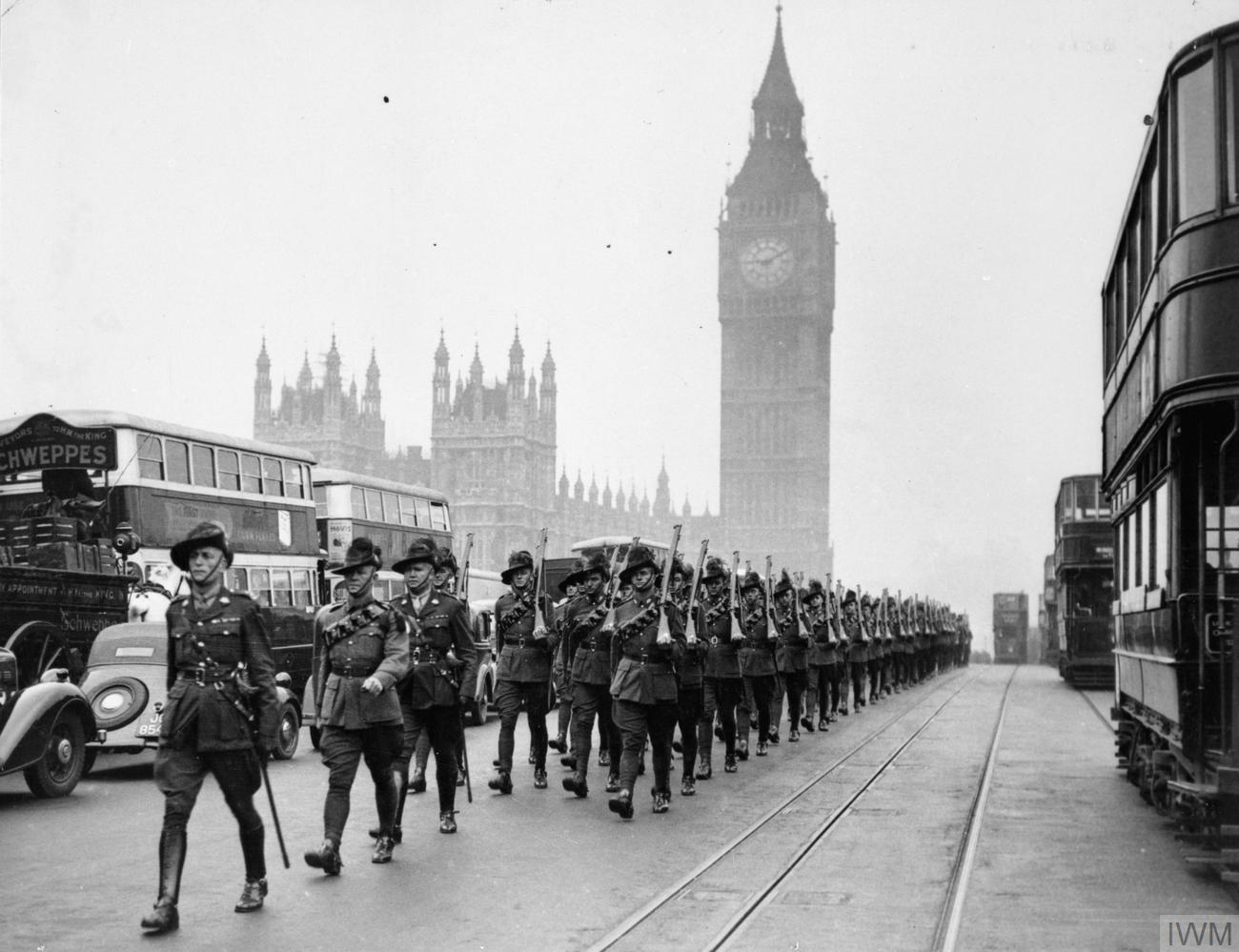
Australian soldiers marching across Westminster Bridge in London during 1940

Elements of the Second Australian Imperial Force (AIF) were located in the United Kingdom (UK) throughout World War II. For most of the war, these comprised only a small number of liaison officers. However, between June and December 1940 around 8,000 Australian soldiers organised into two infantry brigades and supporting units were stationed in the country. Several small engineer units were also sent to the UK, and up to 600 forestry troops were active there between July 1940 and mid-1943. A prisoner of war (POW) repatriation unit arrived in the UK in August 1944, and over 5,600 released AIF prisoners eventually passed through the country. Following the war, small numbers of Australian soldiers formed part of a military cricket team which toured England, and the Army contributed most members of the Australian contingent to the June 1946 victory parade in London.

Although the UK had accommodated the main rear base for the First Australian Imperial Force during most of World War I, the deployment during 1940 was the only time significant numbers of Australian combat soldiers were stationed in the country during World War II. These soldiers arrived in mid-June on a convoy which had been diverted from its original destination in the Middle East. During the Battle of Britain the Australian force formed part of the mobile reserve which would have counter-attacked any German amphibious or airborne landings in southern England. The Australians were moved to eastern England in October 1940, and departed the country in several convoys between mid-November 1940 and January 1941 to concentrate the AIF in the Middle East.

In August 1944, AIF personnel arrived in the UK and established facilities to accommodate and support the thousands of Australian POWs held by Germany once they were released. Significant numbers of released AIF POWs arrived in the UK during the last weeks of the war in Europe and after the German surrender in May 1945. After being granted a period of leave, these men were accommodated at reception camps located in and around the coastal town of Eastbourne until they could be repatriated to Australia. Almost all of the released prisoners had departed the UK by August 1945.

== Background ==
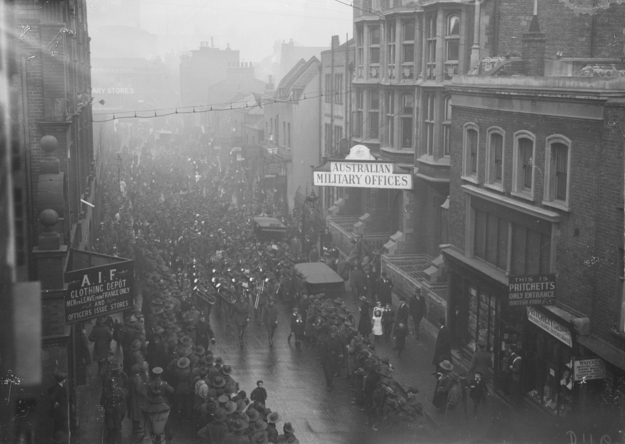
Released Australian prisoners of war marching past the First Australian Imperial Force's administrative headquarters on Horseferry Road in London during 1918

At the time of the two world wars, Australia and the United Kingdom (UK) had a very close relationship. Australia was a self-governing dominion within the British Empire, and its foreign and defence policies were strongly influenced by those of the British Government. Most Australians were either descended from Britons or had been born in the UK, leading to a widespread perception that Britain was the "Mother Country".

The UK accommodated the rear base for the First Australian Imperial Force for most of World War I. The AIF had been formed in 1914 and comprised soldiers who had volunteered for service outside Australia. From 1916 until the end of the war in 1918, the majority of the AIF fought on the Western Front in France. The force's administrative headquarters was in London, and large numbers of Australian training, medical and other support facilities were in the UK. Australian soldiers also frequently took leave in the country. As a result, virtually all members of the AIF who served in France passed through the UK. Historian Roger Beckett has written that "from summer 1916 to the end of the war there were never fewer than 50,000 Australian troops in Britain". Following the war's conclusion in November 1918, all AIF personnel in France were gradually transferred to the UK, from where they embarked on ships bound for Australia. In May 1919, the remaining elements of the AIF in France were moved to the UK, leading to the number of Australians there peaking at 70,000. By the end of 1919, almost all AIF personnel had departed the UK, and the force was formally disbanded on 1 April 1921.

Following the outbreak of World War II, the Australian Government established a Second Australian Imperial Force on 15 September 1939. Volunteers for the AIF were liable for service in Australia or overseas. Four AIF infantry divisions were eventually established, of which three were deployed to the Middle East and one to Malaya between 1940 and 1941.

Elements of the Royal Australian Air Force (RAAF) and Royal Australian Navy (RAN) were stationed in the UK during World War II. Several flying squadrons and more than 10,000 RAAF airmen who had been trained under the Empire Air Training Scheme served in the country. A small number of RAN warships operated from the UK at various times between 1940 and 1942, and by 1943 over a thousand Australians were posted from RAN to Royal Navy vessels.

== Liaison officers ==
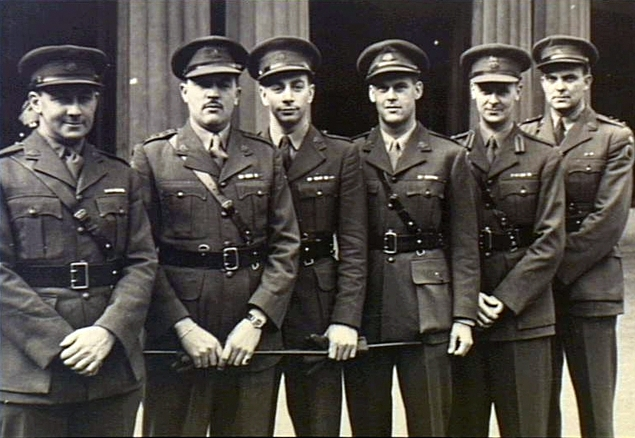
Officers assigned to the Australian Army Staff (UK) and prisoner of war reception units in the courtyard of Buckingham Palace at the conclusion of an investiture in October 1944

The Australian Army, RAN and RAAF had liaison teams in London throughout the war. These officers were based at the High Commission of Australia in London. This continued pre-war arrangements, which included an Australian representative to the British War Office and the Imperial General Staff as well as advisers to the High Commissioner. Lieutenant General Edward Smart was appointed the head of the Australian Military Mission to the UK in October 1942. His role included representing Australia on senior decision-making bodies located in the UK. An Army officer also served on the staff of Australia's representative to the British War Cabinet. In March 1945 they were joined by RAN and RAAF officers. (Note: Earl Page was the initial Australian representative to the British War Cabinet, and held the role from December 1941 to June 1942. High Commissioner Stanley Bruce served as the representative for the remainder of the war, but was rarely invited to War Cabinet meetings.) As of April 1944, the Australian Military Mission's offices were located at Sloane Gardens in Chelsea. Smart remained the head of the Australian Army Staff (UK) until his retirement in July 1946.

The Army's medical branch also maintained specialist liaison staff in the UK. Major General Rupert Downes, who as the Director General of Medical Services was the Army's senior medical officer, arrived in the country shortly before the outbreak of war in 1939. During his visit to London, he secured the services of two eminent Australian physicians, the surgeon Sir Thomas Dunhill and Neil Hamilton Fairley, to serve as technical advisers to the Army. These two men provided valuable advice to the Australian Army during the early period of the war, including by passing on copies of medical literature and personal accounts of surgery and treatments. Dunhill also mentored Australian surgeons who were either working in the UK or were sent there during the war to gain experience. Shortly after the outbreak of war in September 1939, a medical liaison officer was posted to the High Commission. This officer reported on new developments in medical treatments, and helped to facilitate orders of medical equipment for the Army.

Other Australian soldiers served in specialist and staff roles in the UK. For example, Major General Sydney Rowell was the Director of Tactical Investigation at the War Office from March 1944 until the end of the war. In April 1944, two majors from the Army's Directorate of Research, W.E.H Stanner and John Kerr, were also temporarily attached to the Australian Army Staff in London. These officers remained in the UK for eight months, during which time they reported on British civil affairs practices, post-war planning and the War Office's financial and research arrangements.

In addition to their military functions, the AIF personnel in the UK publicised the force's achievements. In April 1944, the Department of Information and the Australian Army Staff in London jointly arranged for a series of pamphlets describing the AIF's campaigns to be distributed in the UK by the British Army Bureau of Current Affairs. In November that year, 250,000 copies of the booklet The Australian Army at War were printed by His Majesty's Stationery Office on behalf of the Australian Army Staff and distributed in the UK.

== Combat forces ==
=== Arrival in the UK ===
In November 1939, the Australian War Cabinet agreed to a request from the British Government for the 6th Division, the AIF's first combat formation, to be sent from Australia to the Middle East to complete its training. If the security situation in the Middle East permitted, it was intended to transfer the AIF to either the UK or France once its training was complete to receive its equipment. When fully trained and equipped, the AIF was to become part of the British Expeditionary Force (BEF) in France.

The first of the division's three brigades to deploy, the 16th, sailed from Fremantle, Western Australia on 20 January 1940 and arrived in Egypt on 12 February. In late April, the British Government became concerned that Italy was about to enter the war alongside Germany following the successful German invasion of Norway. At this time, the two convoys transporting the 6th Division's other brigades to the Middle East were en route. Convoy US 2, which was transporting the 17th Brigade, was in the Indian Ocean and Convoy US 3 was off the Australian coast. Convoy US 3 was carrying 8,000 Australian soldiers assigned to the 18th Brigade and other units as well as 6,000 New Zealanders.

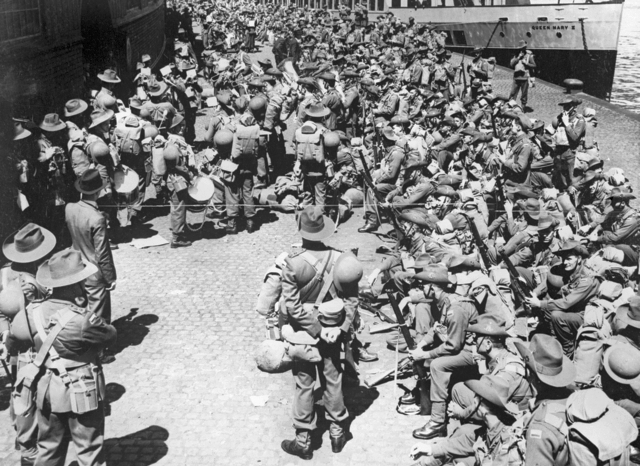
Australian soldiers shortly after disembarking at Gourock in June 1940

On 1 May, Anthony Eden, the British Secretary of State for Dominion Affairs, sent the Australian Government a cable proposing that both convoys be diverted to the UK. Eden justified his proposal on the grounds of the undesirability of sending convoys past Italian naval bases in the Red Sea due to the risk of attack, and the possibility of it becoming difficult to send supplies from the UK to equip units in the Middle East. In response, the Australian Government directed that Convoy US 2 be held at Colombo and US 3 at Fremantle until it received advice on the war situation from the British and Australian Chiefs of Staff. The government had a strong preference for the AIF to be concentrated in one place, so it could fight under Australian command. The Australian Chiefs of Staff initially supported the proposal to send both convoys to the UK on the grounds that it would result in the brigades being deployed to the main theatre of war, would ease the problems associated with equipping these units and would encourage volunteers for another AIF division which was being formed at the time. However, on 4 May the British Chiefs of Staff recommended that both convoys proceed to the Middle East. The Australian Chiefs of Staff subsequently endorsed this position. As a result, on 8 May the Australian Government directed the convoys to continue to the Middle East. Convoy US 2 arrived in Egypt on 18 May.

Convoy US 3's destination changed following the German invasion of France on 10 May 1940, which further increased the probability that Italy would enter the war. On 15 May, the British Government proposed again that Convoy US 3 be diverted to the UK. The Australian Chiefs of Staff endorsed this proposal, but the War Cabinet remained reluctant to split the AIF. Instead, the War Cabinet asked whether the troops could be sent to either South Africa or North-West India to complete their training before joining the 6th Division in Egypt. Several ministers believed that the British Government was seeking to divide the AIF into separate elements which would operate under direct British command. After being advised by the British Government that accommodation and equipment for the troops were not likely to be available in India or South Africa, the War Cabinet agreed on 19 May for Convoy US 3 to proceed to the UK. At this time the Allied forces in France were rapidly retreating. The New Zealand Government had agreed in April for its soldiers on Convoy US 3 to be sent to the UK in the event that the ships were unable to enter the Red Sea.

On 4 June, the Chief of the Australian General Staff, General Brudenell White, recommended to the War Cabinet that the 6th Division be immediately transferred from the Middle East to Marseille in France to complete its preparations for combat before entering the fighting there. Most elements of the BEF were being evacuated from Dunkirk at this time, but the British Government intended to reconstitute it in France. The 6th Division was not combat-ready, as it still had not completed training or received key equipment. The War Cabinet rejected White's proposal, and agreed to remind the British Government of its previous assurances that the AIF would be concentrated in a single location. A proposal made in late June by the British Medical Directorate for Australian soldiers who were wounded in the Middle East to be sent to the UK to recover for as long as the Mediterranean remained open to Allied shipping was also rejected.

Convoy US 3 arrived at Gourock in Scotland on 17 June. The reception party which greeted the troops was led by the First Lord of the Admiralty, Albert Alexander, and Under Secretary of State for the Dominions, Geoffrey Shakespeare. Shakespeare delivered a welcome message from King George VI. The combat units which arrived with the convoy included the 18th Brigade, which was made up of the 2/9th, 2/10th, and 2/12th Battalions. The force also included some of the 6th Division's combat support units, including the 2/3rd Field Regiment, 2/1st Anti-Tank Regiment, 2/1st Machine Gun Battalion, 2/3rd Field Company and the 2/1st Field Park Company. Most of the 6th Division's signals, Army Service Corps and ordnance personnel as well as 459 infantrymen who had been dispatched as reinforcements had travelled on the convoy. As well as medical personnel assigned to individual units, the force included the medical staff of the 2/3rd Field Ambulance and 3rd Australian Special Hospital and 77 female members of the Australian Army Nursing Service.

The force was commanded by Major General Henry Wynter. This officer had embarked on the convoy to take up a position with the I Corps headquarters, and been both promoted and appointed to the role on 14 June. The commander of the 18th Brigade, Brigadier Leslie Morshead, had previously been the senior officer for the AIF units on Convoy US 3. Wynter's command was designated "Australforce" after its arrival in the UK.

=== Reorganisation ===
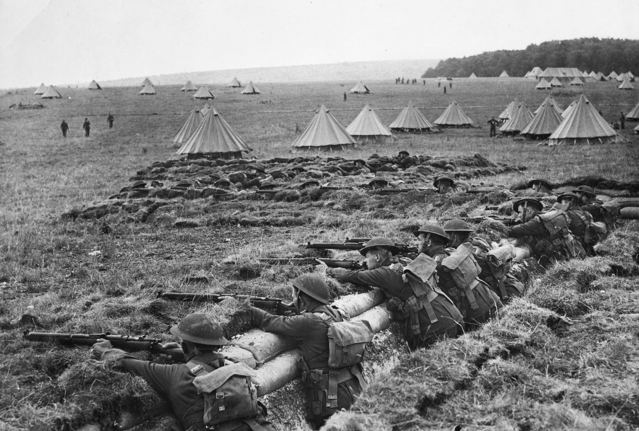
Troops of the 2/10th Battalion training during June 1940

Immediately after disembarking, Australforce proceeded to Salisbury Plain in southern England to prepare to resist what seemed like an imminent German invasion. Its lead elements arrived there on 18 June. Most elements of Australforce were housed in tents near Tidworth. Wynter's AIF Administrative Headquarters was at the mansion of Amesbury Abbey and the 18th Brigade's headquarters was at Lopcombe Corner, near Winterslow. On the night of 19/20 June, the Australian soldiers observed an air raid on the nearby city of Southampton from their accommodation.

Reorganising Australforce was an early priority for Wynter. Official historian Gavin Long described the force which arrived on Convoy US 3 as a "hodge-podge" of units, and noted that none of its elements had their full allocation of equipment. The infantry was armed only with rifles and machine guns, the artillery had no guns and the number of vehicles and supplies of technical equipment fell short of requirements. After considering options developed by Morshead to form the force into a strong brigade group with supporting units, Wynter instead chose to organise it into two infantry brigades (the 18th and the new 25th), each with three battalions. These brigades were to be supported by a machine gun battalion, two field batteries, two anti-tank batteries, two companies of engineers and support units. The 25th Brigade's three new infantry battalions were to be manned by the 459 infantry replacements and 1,300 soldiers transferred from the artillery, machine gun and support units. A small number of officers and enlisted men were also to be transferred from the 18th Brigade. Due to manpower shortages, the new battalions would be organised into three rifle companies rather than the standard four. Wynter selected this organisation as he expected that artillery guns and technical equipment would take a long time to be delivered, and there was a high probability that his force would need to go into combat at short notice with what it had. The British War Office approved this structure by 22 June.

Wynter believed that it would take about a month for the 25th Brigade to be "in reasonable shape". He appointed Colonel William Bridgeford, who had previously been a liaison officer at the High Commission of Australia, to command the formation. The new infantry battalions were initially numbered the 2/28th, 2/29th and 2/30th Battalions, but were redesignated the 70th to 72nd Battalions after it was learned that these names had already been allocated to units which were to be formed in Australia. The three battalions' titles were selected to continue the numbering assigned to infantry battalions of the First AIF, which had reached the 69th Battalion. Many of the technical personnel who were transferred to the 25th Brigade's infantry battalions were unhappy, as they believed this misused their specialist skills.

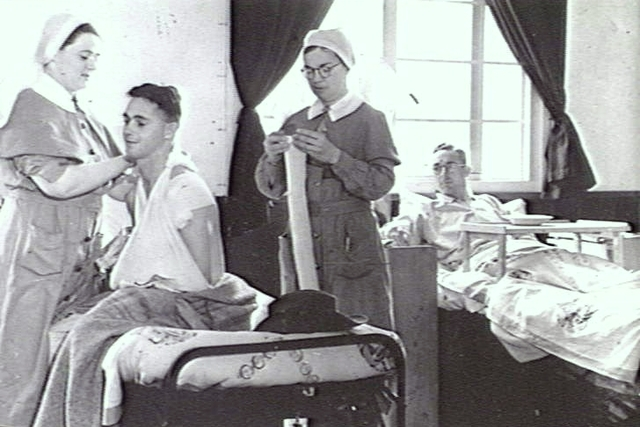
Two nurses tending to an injured soldier in the 2/3rd Australian General Hospital

Australforce's medical units were also reorganised to provide adequate support for the soldiers. The two brigades required greater medical services than the initial structure of medical units could provide, leading to the 2/3rd Field Ambulance being split in half to establish the 2/11th Field Ambulance. One of these units was allocated to each brigade. Establishing a hospital to provide medical care for the force was a priority, but it proved difficult to find a suitable facility in which an Australian hospital could operate independently of British units. Eventually a wing containing 360 beds at the King George V Sanitorium in Godalming was allocated to the AIF, and the 2/3rd Australian General Hospital was established on 30 July to operate it. This unit absorbed the 3rd Special Hospital, and several medical officers from other units were transferred to it. The 2/3rd Australian General Hospital provided a wide range of services, but lacked specialists in X-rays, eye conditions and anaesthesia. Australforce had more than enough nurses to staff the facility, and those who were not needed there were posted to nearby British hospitals. Due to shortages of Australian orderlies, local women were hired to provide domestic services.

Detention facilities were established in the UK. Prior to Australforce's arrival, it had been intended to use British Army facilities to hold Australian offenders. However, these facilities were found to be overcrowded and unable to accommodate many Australians. After a period in which offenders other than those serving long sentences were held by their units, the AIF (UK) Detention Camp was established on 7 August near Salisbury. It soon proved to be too small, and at times soldiers under sentence had to wait their turn to be imprisoned. Offenders serving lengthy sentences, including three soldiers convicted of mutiny on 29 October, were held in civil prisons.

Throughout its time in the UK, Australforce undertook training and sought to improve its equipment holdings. An infantry leaders school was established in late June, and several British non-commissioned officers were posted to it as instructors. An important function of this school was to train the artillerymen, engineers and other specialists who had been transferred into the new infantry battalions. Australian gunners also undertook courses at a British artillery school at Larkhill. Equipment was slow to arrive, as Britain had used most of its stocks to equip the BEF and now needed to re-equip its surviving formations. The infantry battalions only reached their training stocks of weapons in late July, and these fell well short of the full combat allocations. On 4 July, King George VI inspected Australforce and observed training exercises. British Prime Minister Winston Churchill also visited the force on 4 September.

=== Anti-invasion preparations ===
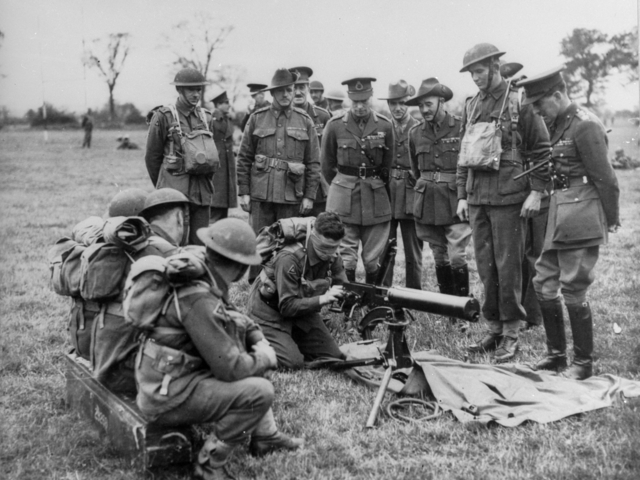
King George VI watching a blindfolded Australian soldier assemble a machine gun

Despite the poor state of Australforce's equipment, on 26 July it was assigned a key role in British counter-invasion plans. The 18th Brigade and the force's machine gun and artillery units were selected as the Southern Command Striking Force. In the event of invasion, the Australian units would be augmented by a British field artillery battery. Two or three other mobile striking columns were also to be formed from British troops located in the Salisbury Plain area. The Australforce's headquarters would have commanded all of these units. If a mobile striking force was not considered necessary, the 18th Brigade and other units were to form the reserve for V Corps. To ensure that they could rapidly respond to an invasion, trucks carrying live ammunition accompanied all elements of the brigade when they left camp to undertake training exercises. As of July, Wynter believed that the 25th Brigade was capable of only local defence duties in the Salisbury Plain area.

Australforce remained on alert throughout the peak of the Battle of Britain. On 13 July, a German bomber machine gunned the 2/9th and 2/10th Battalions' accommodation, wounding a soldier. Long states that this man was probably the AIF's first combat casualty. The encampments on Salisbury Plain were repeatedly bombed during August, and Australian positions were struck on three consecutive days. These attacks did little damage, however. The Australian soldiers also often observed British and German aircraft Dogfighting. They fired on German aircraft which came within range of their guns, though as little training in aircraft recognition had been provided some Royal Air Force machines were mistakenly attacked. On 7 September, the Germans mounted the first major air raid on London, leading the British command to issue warnings that an invasion was imminent. As a result, the Australian mobile units were placed on one hour's notice to move. The 18th Brigade was assigned the role of countering a German paratrooper landing on Salisbury Plain throughout the crisis period in September. Morshead believed that a German invasion was inevitable. Australforce and the other mobile units in the UK were directed to stand down on 23 September, after the threat of invasion had passed.

While the Australian units were mainly focused on preparing for combat, the soldiers were able to take leave. Soldiers began to be granted 36-hour periods of leave from 27 June, but no more than 10 percent of each infantry battalion could be absent at any time. Many took the opportunity to visit London, where accommodation was made available in Westminster Hall. From 21 August, the maximum allowable period of leave was extended to six days, and up to 15 percent of battalions could be absent. Those taking leave were issued with free rail passes for travel within England. The Australian High Commission did not provide any facilities for soldiers on leave at Australia House in London, its main offices. The Agents-General for individual Australian states in London offered hospitality to the troops, and facilities for them were established at the Strand Theatre and the Royal Empire Society. After being criticised for not assisting soldiers, the High Commission established the Australian Forces Centre at Australia House. This was expanded to the Boomerang Club in 1942 which provided a comprehensive range of services to members of the Australian military. These services included recreation facilities, cheap meals, advice on accommodation, a bookstall and stocks of military kit.

=== Withdrawal from the UK ===
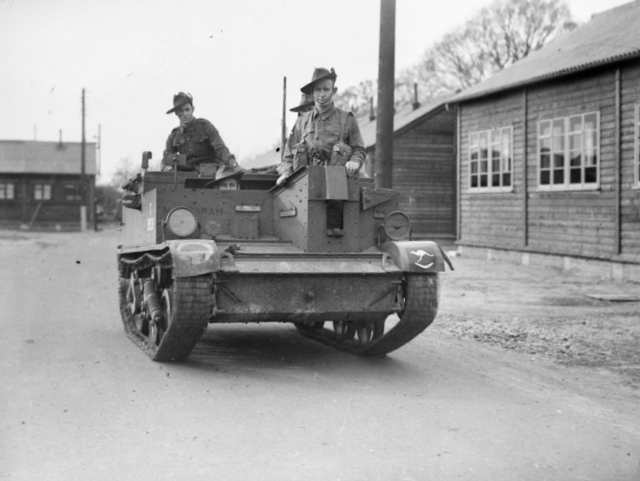
Australian soldiers operating a Universal Carrier in the UK during late 1940

The Australian Government remained committed to concentrating the AIF in the Middle East, and discussions of options to transfer Australforce there commenced in August 1940. On 23 August, Wynter directed that the 2/3rd Field Regiment and 2/1st Anti-Tank Regiment be re-established as part of preparations for this move. At about this time, the Army Headquarters in Australia decided to retain the 25th Brigade as a permanent element of the AIF. All unit commanding officers were advised on 28 August that Australforce was under orders to transfer to the Middle East, and were directed to have their units ready to depart within 24 hours by 15 September. On 15 September, the British Government advised the Australian Government that Australforce would be dispatched to the Middle East, but British units were substituted for the Australians on 21 September. The Australian Government did not object to this delay in transferring the AIF. On 29 September, Army Headquarters advised Wynter that Australforce was to be used as the nucleus for a new 9th Division.

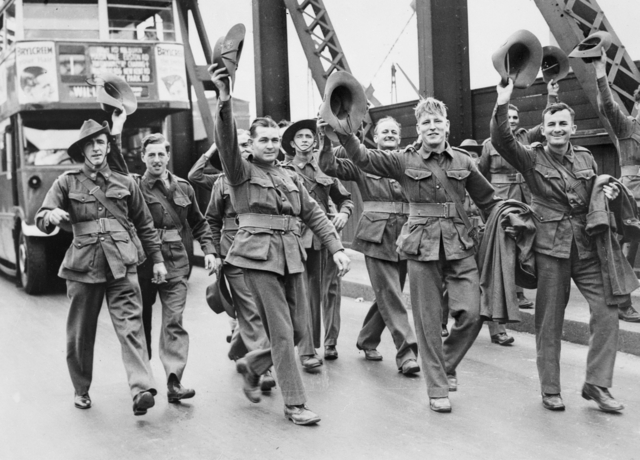
Australian soldiers on leave in London during August 1940

On 16 October, Australforce was transferred to Colchester to the east of London where it became part of Eastern Command. The 18th Brigade was assigned to the town's garrison, and the 25th Brigade became part of XI Corps mobile reserves. Due to the Australian soldiers' reputation for drunkenness and disorder, the Colchester town council considered introducing restricted trading arrangements for the town's hotel. Morshead was concerned about the possible loss of recreational opportunities for his men, and informed Colchester's mayor that if this occurred "he wouldn't answer for the consequences". However, Morshead also expected the 18th Brigade's soldiers to behave responsibly while off-duty. As part of the redeployment of Australforce, the AIF (UK) Detention Camp moved to Colchester on 23 October. At its peak size on 5 December 1940, 107 soldiers were held there. Between 8 August and 7 December 542 soldiers served sentences at the AIF (UK) Detention Camp. The average daily number of prisoners was 75.

Wynter was appointed to command the 9th Division on 23 October. At this time he was on two weeks' sick leave, and Morshead was the acting commander. On 30 October, King George VI inspected Australian troops again at Colchester. The 25th Brigade's infantry battalions were also renumbered again during October, with the 70th Battalion becoming the 2/31st, the 71st the 2/32nd and the 72nd the 2/33rd.

The force finally left the UK between mid-November 1940 and early January 1941. The 18th Brigade embarked onto ships at Glasgow on 15 November, and reached Alexandria in Egypt on 31 December. The 25th Brigade remained at Colchester for several more weeks, and embarked on 3 January 1941. It reached Palestine on 10 March. The 2/3rd Australian General Hospital remained in the UK until mid-March to enable all of the sick or chronically unwell soldiers to be collected; it departed on 17 March. As part of a reorganisation of the AIF, the 18th and 25th Brigades were reassigned to the 7th Division following their arrival in the Middle East, and remained with this formation for the rest of the war.

=== 1941–1945 ===
Following the departure of Australforce, a small AIF administrative section remained in the UK as part of the military liaison staff at the High Commission of Australia. The small numbers of soldiers who were serving lengthy periods of imprisonment in British Army detention facilities or civil prisons also remained in the country until they completed their sentence.

In 1944, 13 members of the AIF were posted to the UK to gain experience in planning and conducting large-scale amphibious operations as part of an effort to improve the army's procedures ahead of Australian landings in the Pacific. The team was made up of officers representing each of the Army's corps, and included some of the most talented and experienced members of the service. Most of these men subsequently served in combat with British units in Western Europe.

== Engineers ==
In 1939, the British Government requested that Australia raise three 200-man strong companies of foresters as part of an intended force of thirty such units drawn from Canada, New Zealand and the UK which was to support the BEF in France. The Australian Government agreed. The three forestry companies were classed as engineer units. In line with a request from the French Government, all of their officers were members of either the Commonwealth or State government forest services or employed in the sawmilling industry. The enlisted soldiers were also highly skilled forestry workers.

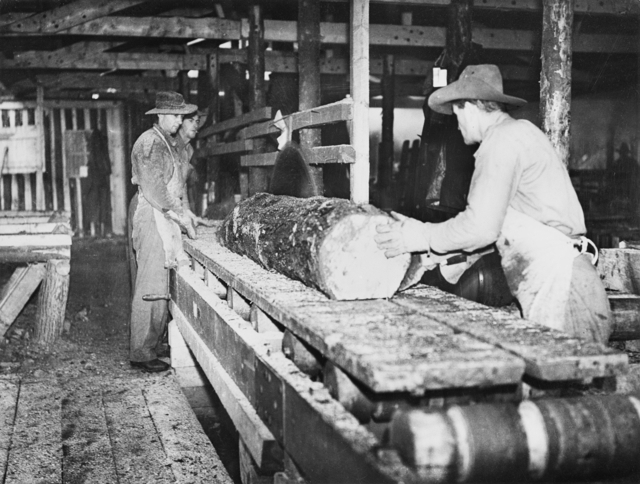
Australian Army foresters working in a sawmill during late 1940

The 1st and 2nd Forestry Companies were formed in February 1940, and arrived in the UK during July that year. Upon arrival, they undertook military training in southern England. Both units began cutting timber in Northumberland during September 1940. The Australians experienced difficulty working in the cold climate, and many fell sick over the winter of 1940/41. They also needed to adapt their methods to those used in the UK. The 3rd Forestry Company arrived in early 1941. In July that year, the Australian Forestry Group UK was established to command the three units. It was led by Lieutenant-Colonel C.R. Cole throughout its existence. A medical officer was attached to the group to supervise the foresters' medical treatment. All three companies were relocated to Dumfriesshire in Scotland during 1941.

The foresters had closer and more frequent interactions with British civilians than the AIF infantry units. They were initially Billeted with civilians in private homes, and later usually accommodated in camps located near villages. The foresters were granted local leave most days, which allowed them to drink in pubs after completing their work. By the time the Forestry Group returned to Australia, 120 of its men had married British women and 40 children had been born.

To maximise the Australian foresters' productivity, less skilled forestry workers from Honduras and Italian prisoners of war (POWs) were placed under their control to undertake unskilled work. As well as working with timber, the forestry companies also maintained their military skills. They undertook military training for one day each week and a fortnight every six months. The companies were allocated roles in British counter-invasion plans. Despite this training, the foresters were not involved in any combat.

The size of the Forestry Group decreased over time due to illness and a shortage of reinforcements. While 30 foresters had been scheduled to be sent to the UK as reinforcements every six months, only two such parties were dispatched. The Forestry Group was informed in August 1942 that no further reinforcements would be sent. By June the next year the Forestry Group was 29 men under-strength. Due to the lack of reinforcements, in April 1943 Smart proposed to Army Headquarters that one of the forestry companies be disbanded and its personnel used to reinforce the others. This proposal was rejected.

In mid-1943 the Australian Government asked the British Government to release the Forestry Group so that it could be redeployed to New Guinea. The British Government agreed, but asked that the 1st Forestry Company remain in Scotland for a further two to three months; the Australian Government endorsed this request. The Australian Forestry Group moved to Sussex at around the same time. The Group departed the UK for Australia on 22 September 1943, but the wives of the men who had married in the UK were unable to accompany them until August 1944 due to a lack of shipping. By the time they left the UK, the Australians had produced 30 million super feet of sawn timber. The foresters paraded through New York City in September 1943 while en route to Australia. Following their return to Australia in November, the forestry companies were deployed to the Northern Territory and New Guinea where they operated sawmills.

An Australian Railway Construction and Maintenance Group also served in the UK. This formation arrived at Liverpool on 17 July 1940 and comprised a company and half of personnel as well as a group headquarters. It was based at a camp in the Woolmer Forest in southern England, where it built several large storage sidings and conducted other work. The Railway Construction and Maintenance Group departed the UK in January 1941 and arrived in the Middle East during March that year.

== Prisoner of war repatriation ==
=== Establishment of POW reception units ===
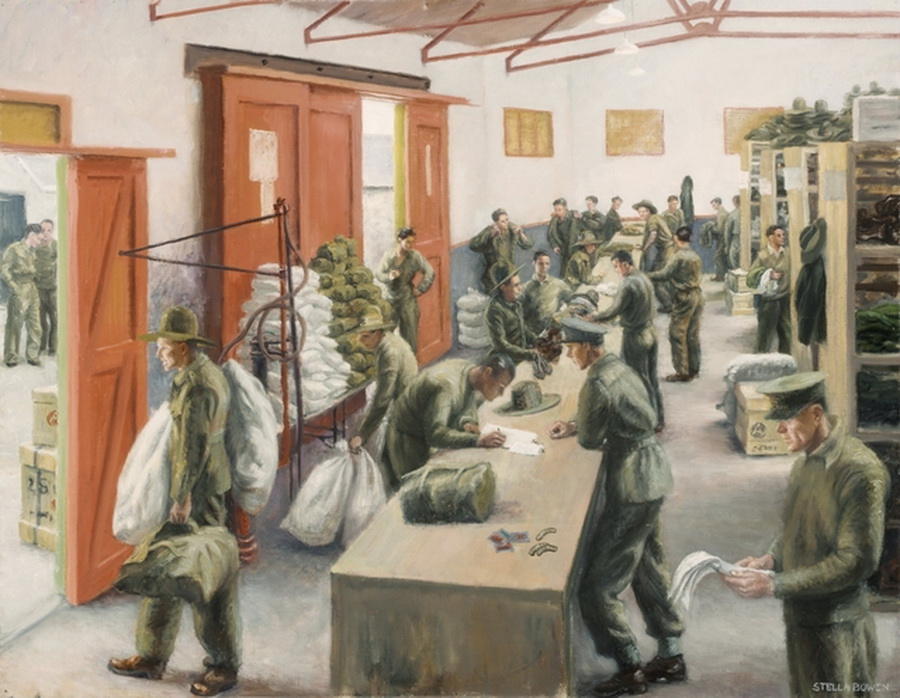
Kit issue at POW reception camp, Eastbourne by official war artist Stella Bowen

Between 1940 and 1942, 7,115 members of the AIF were taken prisoner by Axis forces in North Africa, Greece and Crete. The great majority of these men remained prisoners of war in Germany until the end of the war, and the conditions in which they were held deteriorated considerably over 1944 and early 1945. In January 1945, approximately 5,300 Australian soldiers remained in German custody.

The first former POWs to arrive in the UK were escapees from Axis custody. In November 1942 several such men were attached to the Forestry Group to recuperate. When the Forestry Group was preparing to leave the UK, volunteers were called for to establish a POW reception team. Three officers and twelve enlisted men remained in the UK for this purpose.

In October 1943, 28 Australian soldiers were repatriated from German captivity via the UK as part of a POW exchange. The men disembarked in Scotland on 28 October, where they were greeted by two members of the Australian Army Staff in London and Australian Red Cross representatives. The British Army was responsible for assisting these repatriated Australian POWs in the days immediately after they arrived in the UK. The soldiers then received support from the Australian High Commission until they departed for Australia.

As the war in Europe neared its conclusion, the Allies began preparations to repatriate prisoners of war held in German custody. A multi-national Prisoner of War Executive (PWX) was established within the Supreme Headquarters Allied Expeditionary Force to co-ordinate these efforts, and contact officers were selected to take charge of POWs after they were liberated. Following a request from the British War Office, Australia posted 18 military personnel to Europe to assist with POW repatriation. Of these, 13 were AIF members and the remainder RAAF airmen. The senior liaison officer, Lieutenant-Colonel J. S. Smith, and an RAAF officer were assigned to the PWX. All of the other personnel were posted to units in the field.

Facilities were also established in the UK to accommodate and support released POWs until they could be repatriated to Australia. The 1st AIF Reception Group (United Kingdom) was established in Australia under the command of Brigadier Eugene Gorman during June 1944. It arrived in the UK in August. (Note: Four other POW reception groups were formed to repatriate Australian soldiers who were being held in Japanese custody.) The Reception Group was located at the resort town of Eastbourne on the coast of Sussex, which had comfortable accommodation and good recreation facilities. A transit camp and four reception camps for AIF personnel were established in the town. Several specialist services were attached to the 1st AIF Reception Group; these included a dental unit, a pay office, a provost platoon and a postal unit. Detachments from the Australian Canteen Services and the Australian Red Cross were also attached. Official war artist Stella Bowen was assigned to one of the reception camps to record the former POWs' experiences. The RAN and RAAF established similar facilities for their personnel; the RAAF's was located at Brighton.

=== Operations ===
Due to the poor health of most POWs, Allied policy was to rapidly transport liberated POWs to the UK, usually by air. Few prisoners were freed until April 1945, however. By this time, the 1st AIF Reception Group had handled 209 Australians released during two POW exchanges, as well as small numbers of soldiers who arrived via Italy, Switzerland and the Soviet Union. From 4 April, the AIF Reception Group generally received 30 released POWs per day. This rose to about 100 per day from 20 April, and then gradually increased. After the German surrender on 8 May large numbers of released POWs arrived. The AIF Reception Group handled over 1,000 during the week ending 15 May. The number of released POWs arriving in the UK decreased over the remainder of May, and the last arrived in June. Overall, the AIF Reception Group handled 5,668 released POWs.

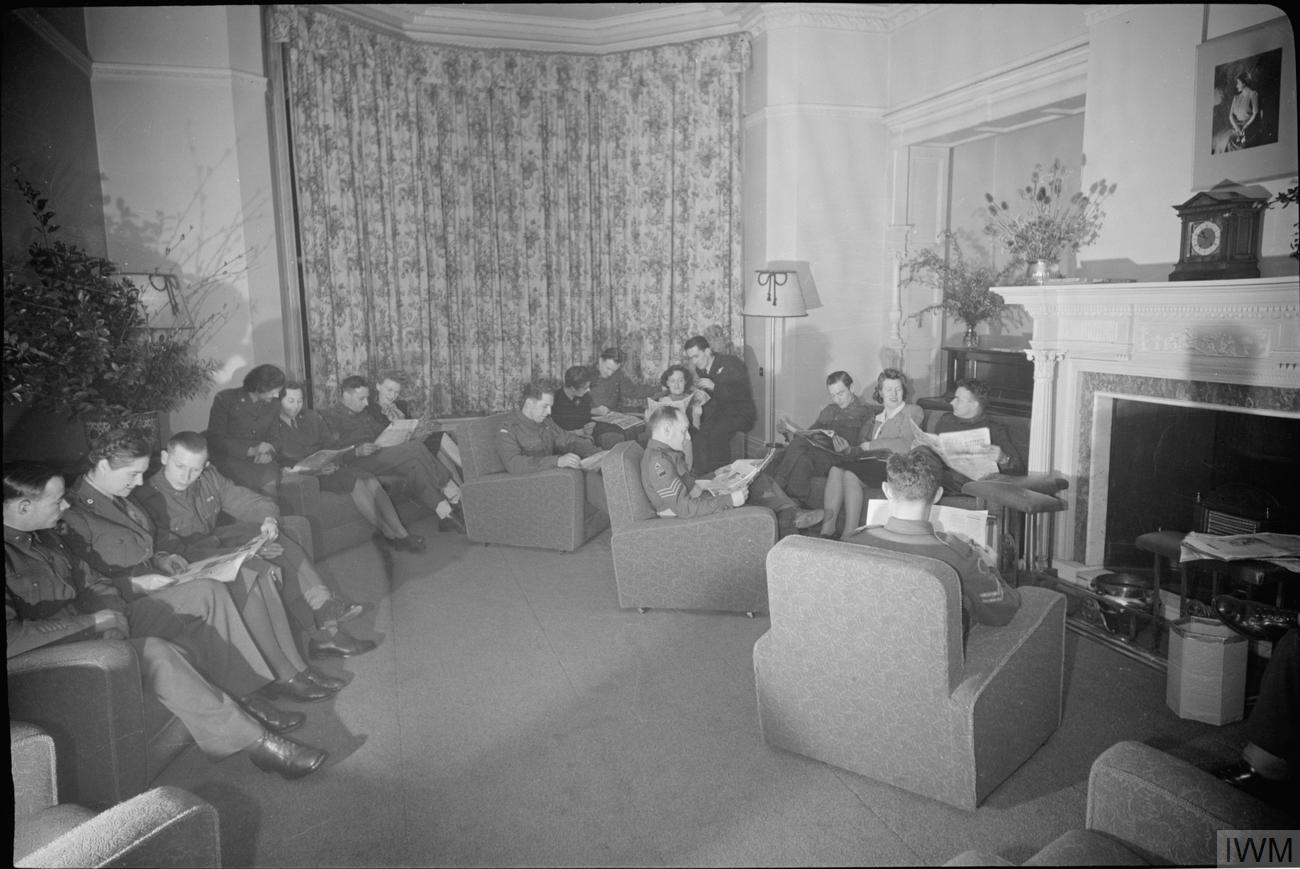
Repatriated POWs, Australian Red Cross staff and civilians relaxing at Gowrie House in Eastbourne

Upon arrival in the UK, the released AIF prisoners of war were either sent to a hospital if they required medical attention or proceeded directly to the AIF Transit Camp at Eastbourne. Hospitalised soldiers were also posted to Eastbourne upon release. Upon arrival at Eastbourne, the soldiers were provided with a meal, accommodation, a uniform and an advance on their pay, as well as a "welcome package" from the Red Cross. They were also allowed to send a cable to Australia free of charge. The soldiers received medical checks and more than double the usual rations. After completing the reception process at Eastbourne, the former POWs were granted 14 days' leave and given free rail passes. When they returned from leave the soldiers were allocated to a reception camp, generally with others from their home state. The former POWs were provided with entertainment, and many also undertook education courses.

The released POWs were repatriated to Australia as quickly as was possible. While it had been feared that the former POWs would have to remain in the UK for up to six months due to a shortage of shipping, it proved possible to dispatch them to Australia at regular intervals. A total of 1,600 departed the UK in May 1945, followed by an equivalent number the next month, almost 2,000 in July and approximately 600 in August. By this time, only a small number of released POWs remained in the UK, comprising men undertaking training and those who had chosen to be discharged there. On average, released POWs needed to wait for three weeks until they embarked for Australia, though many endured waits of two to three months. Most elements of the 1st AIF Reception Group departed the UK in August 1945, and its remaining elements were absorbed into the Australian Army Staff (UK) the next month.

== Post war ==
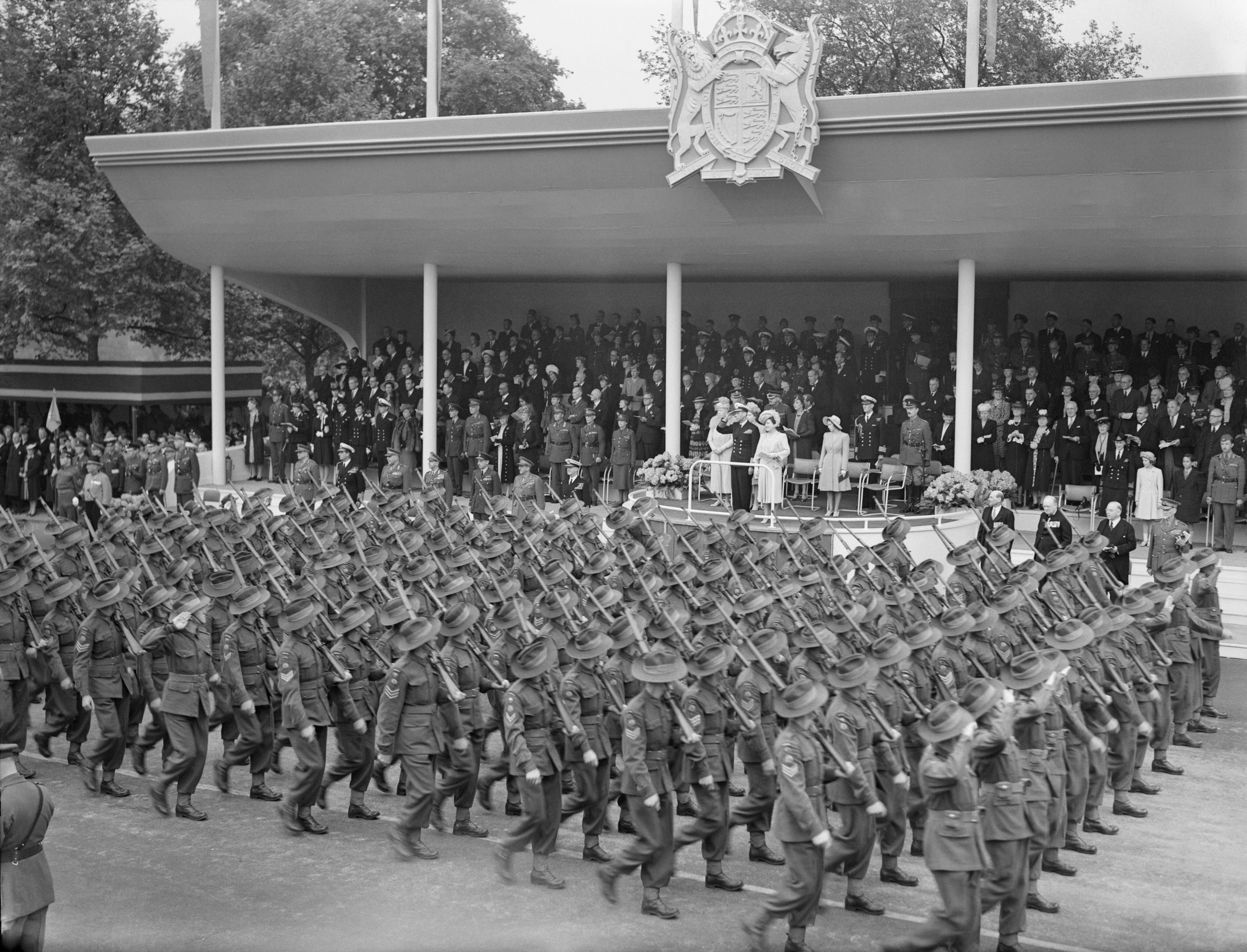
Australian soldiers marching past the saluting base during the victory parade in London on 8 June 1946

A small number of AIF personnel were involved in the Victory Tests series of cricket matches played between the Australian Services cricket team and an English team from 19 May to 22 August 1945. Several members of the team, including its captain Warrant Officer Lindsay Hassett, were seconded to the AIF Reception Group (United Kingdom) and released POWs attended matches.

In March 1946, the Australian Government decided to dispatch 250 members of the military to the UK to take part in the London Victory Celebrations. Of these places, 159 were allocated to the Army, and Major General Kenneth Eather was appointed the contingent's commanding officer. Volunteers were called for, and the selection criteria favoured those who were in very good health, had a distinguished service record and had served outside Australia during the war. Those selected included three soldiers who had been awarded the Victoria Cross and several members of the Australian Women's Army Service.

The Australian Victory Contingent reached the UK on 30 May 1946. The male members of the contingent were accommodated alongside most of the other national contingents at a tented camp in Kensington Gardens in central London. The Australians took part in the victory parade through London on 8 June which was viewed by more than 5 million civilians. Similar parades were held in the Australian state and territory capital cities on 10 June. During their time in the UK, members of the Victory Contingent were encouraged to interact with civilians and be prepared to answer questions about Australia from Britons who were considering emigrating.

Following the victory parade, the contingent was granted an extensive period of leave. All personnel were provided with rail passes entitling them to free travel in England and Scotland. Many members of the contingent accepted offers made by British civilians to billet them in their homes, and others toured Europe. Most of the Victory Contingent departed the UK in late June, though two of the Victoria Cross recipients—Private Richard Kelliher and Sergeant Reginald Rattey—remained in London to receive their medals from King George VI during an investiture ceremony on 9 July.

A total of 33 members of the Second AIF are buried in or commemorated at graveyards administered by the Commonwealth War Graves Commission in the United Kingdom. The majority of these men, 18 soldiers, were members of Australforce who died during 1940. The Australian Forestry Group UK suffered five fatalities, and the other soldiers were members of a range of units.

== See also ==
- Australian Army during World War II
- Australian contribution to the Battle of Normandy
- RAAF Overseas Headquarters
