= John Wesley Mitchell =

Australian soldier

- Born: 16 March 1891; Tarranyurk, Victoria, Australia
- Died: 29 September 1969 (aged 78); Concord, New South Wales, Australia
- Other name: Jack Mitchell
- Spouse: Margaret Blanche West
- Military career
- Allegiance: Australia
- Branch: Australian Army
- Service years: 24 August 1914 - 5 April 1920; 13 October 1939 - 24 November 1944
- Rank: Honorary rank of colonel
- Commands: 2/8th Battalion
- Conflicts: World War I; Gallipoli campaign; Battle of Arras; World War II; Battle of Vevi; Battle of Crete
- Awards: Distinguished Service Order

John Wesley Mitchell, DSO (16 March 1891 – 29 September 1969) was a soldier of the Australian military serving in both World War I and World War II.

== Battle of Vevi ==
The Battle of Vevi was part of the Greek campaign of World War II. It took place on 11–12 April 1941, north of the town of Amyntaion, close to the northwestern Greek border. Allied troops fought forces from Nazi Germany. Australian official historian Gavin Long: "At 2:00 pm ... Lt.-Col. [John] Mitchell of the 2/8th ... ordered a counter-attack which regained some vital ground on top of the ridge... After six hours of intermittent fighting in the pass and on the slopes to the east, the 2/8th still held the Hills though their left had been mauled; the Rangers, however, were rallying astride the road about two miles to the rear, but five of the six supporting guns of the 2/1st Anti-Tank Regiment had been left without protection and abandoned. Thus the ridge held by the 2/8th formed a deep salient." The 2/8th Battalion was effectively destroyed as a fighting force for the rest of the Greek campaign. According to some accounts, at its fallback position of Rodona, the battalion could muster only 250 men, of whom only 50 had weapons. The 2/8th eventually left Greece with the Allies.

== Bibliography ==
Notes

References

- Long, Gavin (1953). Greece, Crete and Syria. Australia in the War of 1939–1945. Vol. II (1st ed.). Canberra: Australian War Memorial.
- Wood, James (2000). "Mitchell, John Wesley (Jack) (1891–1969)". Australian Dictionary of Biography, Australian National University.
