= 2/2nd Field Regiment (Australia) =

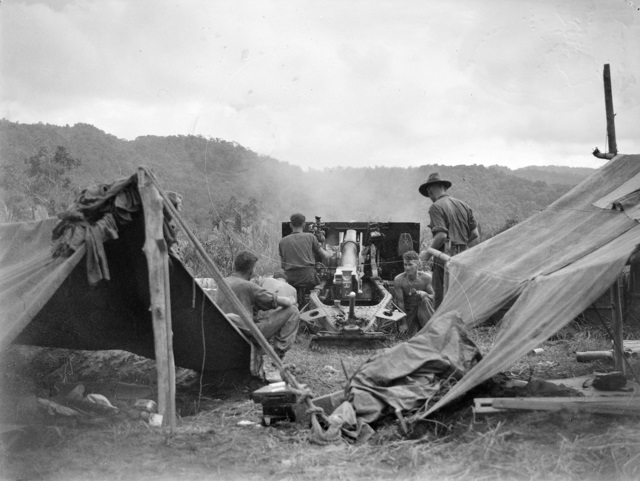
- Guns from the 2/2nd firing around Dagua, New Guinea, March 1945
- Active: 1939–1946
- Country: Australia
- Branch: Army
- Type: Artillery
- Role: Indirect fire support
- Size: 3 batteries
- Part of: 6th Division
- Engagements: World War II: North African campaign; Battle of Greece; Battle of Crete; Aitape–Wewak campaign

The 2/2nd Field Regiment was an Australian Army field artillery regiment that was raised for service during the Second World War. Assigned to the 6th Division, the regiment was formed from Second Australian Imperial Force volunteers. Raised in October 1939, the regiment undertook basic training in Australia before departing for the Middle East in mid-1940. Further training was undertaken in Egypt, before the regiment saw action in the Western Desert in early 1941, and in Greece and on Crete in the middle of the year. Later, they provided a defensive garrison on Ceylon in mid-1942 before returning to Australia. It did not see further action until the final phase of the war, when it was deployed to Aitape–Wewak, fighting against the Japanese, in 1944–1945. It was disbanded in January 1946, after returning to Australia for demobilisation.

== History ==
Formed on 13 October 1939 at the Melbourne Showgrounds in Victoria, the regiment was raised from volunteers from the Second Australian Imperial Force (2nd AIF). Among the first artillery regiments raised as part of the 2nd AIF, it was assigned to the 6th Division, and as the division was established with three artillery regiments, it was allocated initially to support the 17th Brigade. At the outset, the regiment consisted of two batteries: the 3rd and 4th. The training was undertaken at Seymour, Victoria, and Puckapunyal throughout late 1939 and early 1940.

In mid-1940, the regiment deployed to North Africa where further training was carried out, including divisional level exercises at the end of the year. When the Australians went into action in the Western Desert, in January 1941, the regiment support to the 16th Brigade's attack on Bardia and the capture of Tobruk. This was followed by further actions around Derna and Barce, before the 6th Division was relieved and withdrawn to Mersa Matruh, in Egypt, prior to their deployment to Greece in April. This campaign was short-lived as the Allies were quickly overwhelmed by the German advance. During the course of the fighting, the regiment supported several of the 6th Division's brigades: the 16th, around the Veria Pass, then the 19th around Servia, both the 17th and 19th on the Thermopylae Line, and finally the 19th during a rearguard action around the Brallos Pass, before being evacuated by sea from Megara.

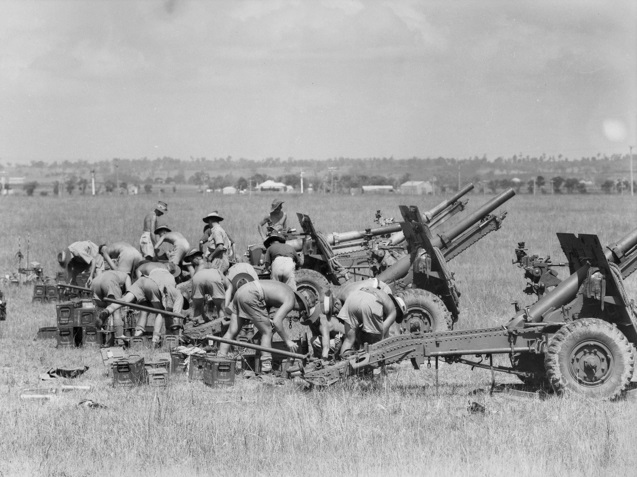
Gunners from the 2/2nd practice firing at Singleton, New South Wales, January 1943

In the chaos that followed the Allied withdrawal from Greece, the regiment was landed on Crete in May. Lacking their guns, the 2/2nd was formed into an ad hoc force known as Cremor Force, which was named after the 2/2nd's commanding officer, Lieutenant Colonel William Cremor. The regiment's headquarters assumed control of the force and the gunners were re-rolled as infantry, fighting alongside elements of the 2/3rd Field Regiment, and the 16th and 17th Brigades, which formed composite battalions with personnel that had been separated from the main body of their brigades when they had been evacuated from Greece. Stationed around Canea and Suda Bay, after the German invasion began on 20 May, Cremor Force saw only limited involvement in the fighting before being withdrawn from Sfakia by the Royal Navy. They reached Egypt by the end of May and moved to Khassa, in Palestine.

After evacuation from Crete, a third battery, the 52nd, was raised for the regiment in September 1941 when it was re-forming in Palestine. In early 1942, the Australian government sought the return of the 6th Division due to the threat of Japanese invasion. En route to Australia, the 16th and 17th Brigades, including the 2/2nd Field Regiment, were diverted to Ceylon where they formed a defensive garrison amidst concerns about a possible Japanese invasion. They returned to Australia in the middle of the year, and after leaving, the unit was reconstituted at Greta, New South Wales. After this, the regiment was detached from the 6th Division, which was reorganised for jungle warfare. This resulted in a reduction of the division's artillery regiments to just one. During 1943, the regiment undertook various assignments around Australia: including Singleton, Cemetery Point, and Narellan.

The regiment did not rejoin the 6th Division until the division's artillery establishment was increased to two regiments in March 1944. It subsequently moved to Wondecla, on the Atherton Tablelands, in Queensland. The role of Australian troops in the Pacific had largely been taken over by US troops by then, leaving the Australian troops with a limited combat role in the last years of the war in the Pacific. As a result, the regiment did not see action again until late in the war when it was committed to the Aitape–Wewak campaign in late 1944 when Australian forces took over from US troops, which were redeployed to the Philippines. Arriving in December 1944, during the campaign, the 2/2nd initially supported the 16th Brigade as it advanced towards Wewak in January 1945. The following month, the 1st Battery was detached from the 2/1st Field Regiment as the advance pushed towards the Danmap River. From May, the 2/1st Field Regiment took over as the lead artillery element supporting the advance. Subsequently, the 2/2nd was mainly used in a reserve role around Dallman Harbour, although the 52nd Battery was pushed forward to support operations further inland.

Following the end of the war, the regiment returned to Australia with the rest of the 6th Division in mid-December 1945 for demobilisation, and was disbanded on 11 January 1946. During the war, 17 members of the regiment were killed in action, while four more died of wounds and five more died of other causes. The following decorations were bestowed: two Distinguished Service Orders, six Military Crosses, one Distinguished Conduct Medal, three Military Medals, one George Medal and one British Empire Medal. Two personnel were appointed as Officers of the Order of the British Empire and one was appointed as a Member of the Order of the British Empire.

== Commanding officers ==
The following officers served as commanding officer of the 2/2nd Field Regiment:

- Lieutenant Colonel Alan Ramsay (1939–1940);
- Lieutenant Colonel William Cremor (1940–1942); and
- Lieutenant Colonel Roy Ford Jaboor (1942–1946).
