= 2/3rd Field Regiment (Australia) =

Australian Army field artillery regiment

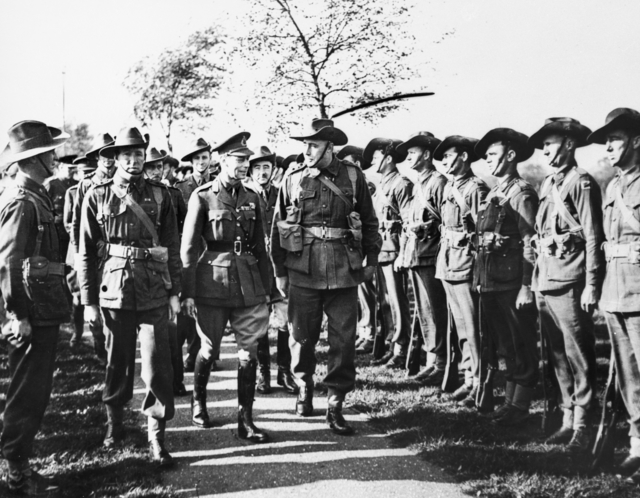
- The King inspects gunners from the 2/3rd Field Regiment, October 1940
- Active: 1939–46
- Country: Australia
- Branch: Army
- Type: Artillery
- Size: ~ 600–700 personnel all ranks
- Part of: 6th Division; 5th Division
- Engagements: World War II: North African campaign; Battle of Greece; Battle of Crete; Aitape–Wewak campaign

Insignia
- Unit colour patch

The 2/3rd Field Regiment was an Australian Army field artillery regiment that was raised for service during the Second World War. Formed in 1939 and assigned to the 6th Division, the regiment was deployed to the United Kingdom to defend against a possible invasion in 1940 before being sent to North Africa, where it briefly saw action prior to being sent to Greece and Crete in 1941. In 1942, the regiment returned to Australia, after which it did not see action again until late in the war when it was committed to the Aitape–Wewak campaign in 1944–45. Following the end of the war, the regiment returned to Australia and was disbanded in January 1946.

== History ==
Formed on 1 November 1939 at Wayville, South Australia, the regiment had an establishment of 32 officers and 595 other ranks, which were drawn from all six Australian states and the Northern Territory. Its first commanding officer was Lieutenant Colonel Athol Hobbs. The majority of the officers and non-commissioned officers were appointed from the Militia. South Australian recruits represented the largest intake and were organised into a complete subunit, the 5th Battery, while recruits from the other states were allocated to the 6th Battery. The regiment began basic training at Woodside Camp during November, before moving to Ingleburn, New South Wales, the following month where more involved training was undertaken. Basic equipment and vehicles were received at this time, but no artillery pieces were issued.

In May 1940, the regiment embarked on HMT Queen Mary bound for the Middle East. En route, the convoy was diverted to the United Kingdom following the German invasion of France. Arriving there in June, the regiment joined other elements of the Second Australian Imperial Force in the United Kingdom. Established at Tidworth Camp in Wiltshire, and then later at Colchester, the regiment was employed on garrison duties to defend against a potential German invasion following the Fall of France. During this time, it was partially broken up to provide personnel to fill out the newly forming 2/31st, 2/32nd and 2/33rd Infantry Battalions. In August, the regiment received a new commanding officer when Lieutenant Colonel Horace Strutt took over. Shortly after this, the regiment was equipped with 25-pounder artillery pieces and Morris gun tractors. It was the first Australian artillery regiment to receive the 25-pounders.

With the threat of invasion over, the regiment was moved to North Africa in November 1940 aboard the Empress of Canada. Arriving in late December, the regiment was assigned to the 6th Division, the regiment saw action against the Italians at Tobruk where they supported the 19th Infantry Brigade. Benghazi fell next and after that was taken, the regiment deployed one battery forward in support of the 17th Infantry Brigade at Marsa Brega. A short time later, though, the regiment was withdrawn back to Ikingi Maryut to re-organise.

In early April 1941, the regiment was sent to Greece, where it supported Australian and New Zealand infantry who were fighting to stop the German invasion there. After arriving on 6 April, the regiment moved forward towards the Yugoslav border where it attempted to defend Vevi in the Florina Valley three days later, where they had the distinction of being the first Australian artillery unit to engage German forces during the war. After mauling an SS force on the Itia–Vevi road, as the Australian and New Zealand forces were pushed back to Servia on 11 April, amidst driving snow the regiment fought a desperate rearguard effort around the Klidi Pass, firing over open sights at advancing German infantry. Falling back by battery through thick mud, the regiment came under attack from German fighter-bombers before they eventually affected their withdrawal.

A disastrous series of withdrawals followed in which the regiment lost all of its equipment. A week later, further withdrawals took them towards Elasson, where the regiment was briefly attached in support of the 6th New Zealand Brigade. On 18 April, the fighting was so intense that the regiment's guns fire over 6,000 rounds in a twenty-four-hour period as it attempted to thwart the advance of a German armoured column near Mount Olympus. Later the regiment supported the 4th New Zealand Brigade around Erithrai. Finally, on 27 April the regiment was evacuated from Greece on board HMS Ajax and withdrawn back to Crete.

Organised as part of the ad hoc Cremor Force, the regiment was initially assigned as a makeshift infantry unit to carry out garrison duties, in early May the regiment was re-equipped with captured Italian and French pieces including 75 mm and 100 mm guns, the regiment was assigned a coastal defence role and moved to Georgioupolis, on the south-east coast of Suda Bay, where the men set to work digging-in in the hills overlooking the beach. When the fighting broke out following the arrival of German parachute troops on 20 May, the regiment was transported to Maleme airfield. Another battery was detached to Retimo and in these places the regiment fought with its guns in support of the 19th Infantry Brigade, while around Megala Khorafia some of the regiment's personnel were thrown into the line as infantry. Around Galatas, as the Germans pressed hard against the Australian and New Zealand defences, the regiment found itself holding the line as the infantry fell back, and as the guns fired over open sights, the gunners defended themselves with small arms.

Later during the month, as the Allies were forced back towards Sphakia, to prevent the Germans from capturing it, the regiment had to destroy most of its equipment. Two of the captured 75 mm guns were saved, though, and were manpacked by men from 'B' Troop over mountainous terrain to act in a rearguard role between Sphakia and Suda, while the Royal Navy attempted to evacuate the stranded troops. The regiment continued to fight until it was withdrawn by sea on 31 May, leaving behind 129 men who were captured by the Germans. Amongst these were the men from 'B' Troop, who had formed the rearguard protecting the evacuation beach. After the departure of the last transport ship, they attempted to evade capture but were eventually rounded up by German patrols. The regiment's total losses for Greece and Crete were 27 killed and 47 wounded. In addition to the men captured on Crete, one other had been captured in Greece. Those that were captured were first sent to Salonica before being sent to a number of prisoner of war camps in Germany, Italy and Austria. While prisoners, numerous escape attempts were made by men from the 2/3rd, although ultimately only four men successfully avoided recapture following their escape.

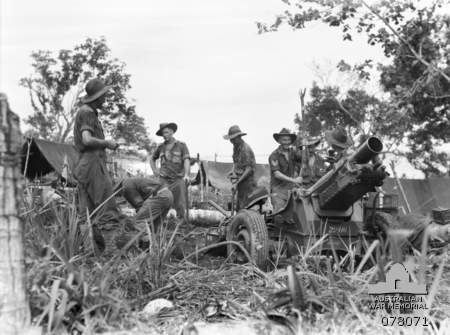
One of the regiment's Short 25-pounders near Danmap, New Guinea, January 1945

While being reformed and re-equipped in Palestine, the regiment received a new commanding officer in October 1941 with the arrival of Lieutenant Colonel Lewis Dyke, a regular officer. A third battery – the 53rd – was raised within the regiment at this time and the regiment adopted a new structure which saw each battery consist of two four-gun troops. This resulted in the regiment's authorised strength reaching 736 personnel of all ranks. The regiment remained in the Middle East until February 1942 when the 6th Division was recalled to Australia in response to the growing threat posed by Japan's entry into the war. Arriving in Adelaide in March, the regiment was stationed at Aldgate until May when it was transferred to Townsville, Queensland, by rail. There, the regiment was reallocated to the 5th Division and assigned a coastal defence role in Cairns, operating antiquated 18-pounder guns. In November, Lieutenant Colonel Gordon Bleby took over as commanding officer.

In June 1943, the regiment returned to the 6th Division and was moved to the Atherton Tablelands, where it was re-organised for jungle warfare. This resulted in the regiment's establishment dropping to 688 personnel. It was also re-equipped with a quantity of short 25-pounders as well as some of the standard pieces. Throughout late 1943 and into 1944, the regiment was based around Wondecla, in Queensland. Due to a perception in the Army that there was little need for artillery in jungle warfare, the regiment did not see action again until December 1944 when it joined the 6th Division's campaign in Aitape–Wewak, once again assigned to the 19th Brigade. In January 1945, the regiment received four 4.2-inch mortars to assist in the provision of close support to long-range infantry patrols; two 155 mm guns were also added to the regiment's equipment scale. Throughout January and February, the regiment supported the advance from Aitape to the Danmap River. As the campaign progressed, in March they were switched to operations between Maprik and Wewak. Late in the campaign, Bleby left the regiment on promotion to 1st Division Headquarters and was replaced by Lieutenant Colonel Cecil Chapman. The regiment saw action right up until the end of the war, and had the distinction of firing the last fire mission in the New Guinea campaign, when on 15 August, it fired 1,000 rounds on "six regimental targets" eight hours after Japan's surrender to deal with a Japanese artillery unit that was continuing to hold out.

Following the conclusion of hostilities, the regiment returned to Australia and was eventually disbanded at Puckapunyal, Victoria, on 18 January 1946. The regiment's casualties amounted to 46 men killed in action or died of wounds or accident, 49 wounded and 130 captured out of a total of 1,887 men who served in its ranks. The following decorations were awarded to 2/3rd members: one Distinguished Service Order, three Orders of the British Empire, four Military Crosses, two Distinguished Conduct Medals, one Military Medal and 43 Mentions in Despatches.

== Commanding officers ==
The following officers served as commanding officer of the 2/3rd Field Regiment:

- Lieutenant Colonel A. J. Hobbs (1939–40);
- Lieutenant Colonel H. W. Strutt (1940–41);
- Lieutenant Colonel L. G. H. Dyke (1941–42);
- Lieutenant Colonel G. E. H. Bleby (1942–45);
- Lieutenant Colonel C. E. Chapman (1945–46).
