= Battle of Vevi (1941) =

Battle during WW2

- Part of World War II
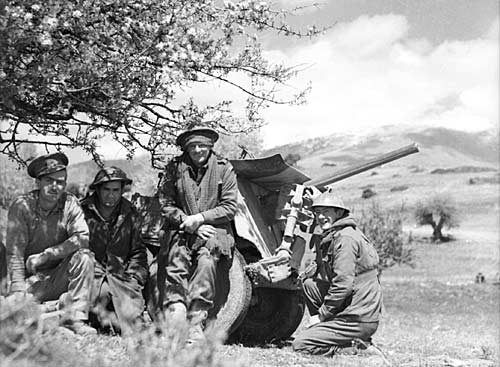
- Members of the Australian 2/1st Anti-Tank Regiment resting, soon after their withdrawal from the Vevi area.
Date	11–12 April 1941
Location	Vevi, Greece
Result	German victory

Belligerents
Australia; Greece; New Zealand; United Kingdom	Germany

Commanders and leaders
(Australia) Iven Mackay (operational) (Australia) George Vasey	(Nazi Germany) Josef Dietrich (Nazi Germany) Wilhelm von Apell (Nazi Germany) Fritz Witt

Strength
Eight infantry battalions Elements of one machine gun battalion and several artillery batteries	One mechanised brigade (Waffen SS); One armoured brigade (German Army)

Casualties and losses
British Empire; 56 killed (28 Australians, (Note: According to the Commonwealth War Graves Commission database there was one Australian dead from the 2/4th battalion on 11 April, plus 26 dead on 12 April belonging to the 2/4 battalion (3 dead), 2/8 battalion (12 dead), 2/1 AT regiment (10 dead) and 2/3 Field Regiment (1 dead)) about 27 British, (Note: According to the Commonwealth War Graves Commission database the 9th battalion King's Royal Rifle Corps (also known as the 1st Rangers) lost 0 dead on 11 April and 27 dead on 12 April. Casualties belonging to the Royal Horse Artillery were not found. The figure of 27 dead represents the minimum, but probably is very close to the complete figure.) 1–2 NZ (Note: Mc Clymont mentions 20 New Zealand "missing" for 12 April, of whom 8 returned to their unit, 11 were captured and 1 was killed. The Commonwealth War Graves Commission database mentions 2 dead for 12 April, one private belonging to 27 MG battalion, and one private referred to generically as "New Zealand Infantry"; both buried in Athens)); 480 captured Greece: 40 killed/wounded (Note: There is no complete casualty figure in the Greek Army's official history. Mentioned casualties are: the commander of the 88th Regiment who was killed, the 11 killed and 18 wounded of the I/88 battalion and 10 killed and wounded of the 2nd company/Dodecanese Regiment. Otherwise, Dodecanese Regiment's battle casualties were "minimal". Known prisoners are the 96 of the I/88 and the 40 men claimed by the Germans to have been taken at Petra. This conforms with the German claim that a total of 600 prisoners were captured.); 136 captured	37 killed 98 wounded 2 captured

The Battle of Vevi (or Veve, Greek: Μάχη της Bεύης), in Greece, also known as the Battle of the Klidi Pass, was part of the Greek campaign of World War II. It took place on 11–12 April 1941, north of the town of Amyntaion, close to the northwestern Greek border. Allied troops fought forces from Nazi Germany.

== Background ==
German forces invaded Greece and southern Yugoslavia from Bulgaria in the first week of April 1941. Following the collapse of resistance in Yugoslavia, the left flank of the Vermion line held by Greek and British Empire forces became exposed. A new plan intended that Imperial British forces would hold off Germans forces in western Macedonia, until non-motorised Greek infantry units had withdrawn on foot from Mount Vermion to Mount Siniatsiko, and a new defensive line had been formed between Mount Olympus and the Aliakmon River.

On the morning of 10 April, the German XL Panzer Corps advanced from Monastir to seize the Greek city of Florina, 13 km (8.1 mi) south of the Yugoslav border, utilising the Monastir Valley (or Monastir Gap). Leibstandarte SS Adolf Hitler (LSSAH), a brigade group-level unit commanded by Oberstgruppenführer Josef "Sepp" Dietrich and accompanied by 9th Panzer Division, advanced further south and occupied the town of Vevi on 11 April. The German 73rd Infantry Division followed behind LSSAH and attacked to the west, to widen the front of the German breakthrough. Confronting the Greek Cavalry Division in an action at Pisoderi Pass, the 73rd failed to make any progress.

A mixed Australian-British-New Zealand-Greek formation – known as Mackay Force – was hastily assembled. Its task, in the words of the British Empire's commander in Greece, General H. Maitland Wilson, was to "stop a blitzkrieg down the Florina Valley." The force was named after its commander, the Australian Major General Iven Mackay, who deployed his headquarters in Perdika.

== Forces ==
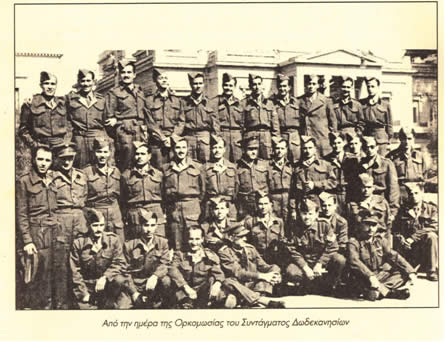
Part of the Greek Dodecanese Regiment

=== Allied ===
The Klidi Pass (Kirli Derven) – which links the towns of Vevi and Klidi to the south – is 100–500 m (110–550 yd) wide, a winding defile, with steep, rocky and treeless sides up to 1,000 m (3,300 ft) high.

During April 1941, conditions at the top of the pass were "bitterly cold"; rain turning into snowstorms. These hindered the ability of the Allied infantry to sleep, especially the Australians and New Zealanders – who were tired after a long and sudden journey from North Africa, and were not experienced in or equipped for wintry, mountain conditions.

Mackay Force was deployed in two sub-sectors: Greek forces around the town of Kelli, 10 km (6.2 mi) east of the pass and British Empire forces at the pass (Kirli Derven) itself.

The British Empire's units occupying Kirli Derven itself were predominantly Brigadier George Vasey's Australian 19th Infantry Brigade: the 2/4th (minus one company) and 2/8th Battalions, complemented by the British 9th Battalion, King's Royal Rifle Corps (also known as the 1st Rangers). The infantry were supported by parts of the New Zealand 27th (Machine Gun) Battalion, the Australian 2/1st Anti-Tank Regiment, the British 2nd Regiment, Royal Horse Artillery and other smaller elements of Australian and British artillery units. Vasey's headquarters were located a substantial distance away, approximately 10 kilometres (6.2 mi) south of the town of Klidi.

Around the pass, Vasey's three infantry battalions were spread across a 16 km (9.9 mi)-wide front: the 2/8th was on the ridge to the east of the pass, the 1st Rangers was on a north-facing spur on the western side, and the 2/4th was to the west of the Rangers, on Golema Glava height 1,001 m (3,284 ft)). New Zealand machine gunners were distributed among the infantry. Australian and British artillery units were concentrated in the pass itself.

The Kelli sub-sector was covered by a Greek brigade-level force, primarily the Dodecanese Regiment (three battalions totaling 3,500 personnel), which was reinforced by the Greek X Border Sector (500 personnel), three Greek artillery batteries (one mountain artillery, one field artillery and one anti-tank artillery battery equipped with 75 mm (2.95 in) field guns), one sapper (engineer) company and one machine gun company. The total strength of the Greek force – under Colonel Sergios Aristotelis – was about 5,000 personnel and 15 guns. The 3rd Battalion, Dodecanese Regiment (III/Dod.) was deployed on the right flank of the British Empire' units, on Delinski Dol heights 1,200 m (3,900 ft)), followed by I/Dod., II/Dod. and X Border Sector to the far right. Two 75mm guns were deployed in the antitank role between III/Dod. and I/Dod., controlling the road that passed through the village of Kelli.

Immediately west of Mackay Force and covering its left flank, across Radosi heights (Mala Reka ridge), were the 350 personnel of the Greek I/88 (1st Battalion, 88th Regiment; 21st Brigade), part of the Greek Cavalry Division.

=== German ===
The German forces detailed for the attack on Klidi Pass belonged to the 9th Panzer Division and LSSAH. During the rapid advance through south Yugoslavia, 9th Panzer had formed a Vorausabteilung Appell (Vor.Abt. Apell; "advance guard formation") under the commander of the 9th Motorised Infantry Brigade (Schützen-Brigade), Oberst Wilhelm von Apell, which crossed into Greece together with the LSSAH. The action would also be supported by artillery from XL Corps' assets.

The Vor.Abt. Apell, on the right flank, consisted of the following units:

- staff, 9th Mot. Infantry Brigade;
- 9th Reconnaissance battalion;
- I./11 Schützenbattalion;
- II./102 Artillerie Battalion minus the 6th battery;
- one battery, 86 FlaK Battalion;
- one company, 50 Panzerjäger Battalion and;
- one company, 86 Panzerpioner Battalion.

From XL Corps' assets, II./37 Schwere-Artillerie-Battalion (2/37th Heavy Artillery Battalion) – with 12 150 mm guns – along with a battery from the 29th Observation Battalion, had the mission of counter-battery fire.

LSSAH placed its battalions as follows: on the right the reinforced I./LSSAH: Kampfgruppe Witt (KG Witt) was to attack Vevi Pass frontally, and on the left the reinforced III./LSSAH would attack the recognised Schwerpunkt (focal point) of the battle, to achieve a breakthrough from Kelli toward Amyntaio. Battalion II./LSSAH, minus its 7th and 8th Companies,) would stay in Florina as a reserve securing the area from south and west. The reconnaissance group (under Kurt Meyer) was initially ordered to link up with 2nd Panzer Division near Edessa, although this plan later changed, so that the reconnaissance group would pursue the Allies toward Sotir after the pass was opened. To support KG Witt, V./LSSAH (a "Heavy Battalion") detached 15 tracked self-propelled artillery pieces, comprising its battery of six Sturmgeschütz III (StuG III) assault guns (75 mm) and its Panzerjäger company of nine Pz.Jg. I (47 mm gun). The LSSAH pioneer battalion would stand behind KG Witt waiting for orders (ie. to clear mines and repair damage on the road). One light howitzer battery would provide direct support to III./LSSAH, and a heavy howitzer battery to KG Witt. The LSSAH artillery regiment, minus an 88 mm Flak battery, would coordinate its actions with KG Witt. Sturmbannführer Fritz Witt led KG Witt, which was composed of:

- the reinforced infantry battalion I./LSSAH;
- the 1st, 2nd, 3rd, 7th and 8th Infantry Companies from II./LSSAH;
- the 4th Machine Gun Company from II./LSSAH;
- two "light infantry weapons" platoons;
- a "heavy infantry weapons" platoon;
- three anti-tank platoons;
- two engineer platoons;
- a light field howitzer troop;
- an 88mm Flak platoon, and;
- a number of StuG III and Pz.Jg. I. (Allied infantry usually referred to the self-propelled guns as "tanks"; neither the Germans nor Allies believed that armoured vehicles would be able to climb the extremely rocky slopes surrounding the pass.)

The dividing line between LSSAH and Vor.Abt. Apell was about two kilometres west of the Niki-Vevi-Klidi road and parallel to it. The missions assigned to them were: the LSSAH was to open the pass, while the Vor.Abt. Apell would move (after the LSSAH attack) from the area of Flambouron toward Aetos and Xino Nero (Eksisou), and the rear of the forces defending the pass.

== Battle ==
=== Opening skirmishes ===
On the Dodecanese Regiment's front at midnight (10/11 April), the Germans attempted reconnaissance patrols and probing attacks against Glava Hill, but were repelled after a two-hour battle. The Germans repeated these actions at 14:00 against Delinski Dol but were also warded off.

The Waffen-SS did not probe the British Empire's front until the afternoon of 11 April. This included an encounter with Australian artillery positions on the main road; Captain Gordon Laybourne Smith (Note: Gordon Laybourne Smith (sometimes spelt 'Laybourne-Smith') was the son of prominent architect Louis Laybourne Smith.) of the 2/3rd Field Regiment later commented that the German commander had sent: "In all his insolence ... trucks down the main road ... to within 3,000 yards [~2,750 metres] of our infantry, and proceeded to debus [i.e. disembark]. At first I could not believe it was an enemy, all had been so still and quiet. Then came some sense. My orders flew over the wire and the first rounds screamed through the air... A few furious moments and back went the Hun [a derogatory term for Germans], but five trucks stayed in the road as silent witness that my troop could shoot". More prolonged skirmishes were directed at the positions of the 2/8th Battalion. These became more aggressive as night closed in. In the words of the Australian War Memorial: "[d]espite being strung out and exhausted from a long march to the position and bitterly cold weather, the 2/8th managed to fend them off."

By the morning of 12 April, fresh snow over 30 cm (11.8 in) deep lay on the hillsides. By dawn, many of the Australians and New Zealanders stationed in the Hills were suffering from frostbite and were unable to operate their weapons effectively. However, orders had now been issued for an orderly withdrawal to the Aliakmon line, to begin that evening.

=== German main assault ===
At 08:30 on 12 April (09:00 according to one German source), the main German attack was launched.). Without artillery preparation, the 1st Company of LSSAH, acting as the vanguard of KG Witt on its left flank, attacked the key Hill 997, which was occupied by a company of the 2/8th Battalion, under Captain Bill Robertson. After hard close fighting, by 11:00 they had captured the Hill, having in the process overrun an Australian platoon of which only six men survived. At 12.30 the 7th KG Witt' company extended the attack toward Hill 917 which it captured after strong resistance by 14:00. The Hill was defended by an Australian company under Captain Coombes at the far left of 2/8th's sector, near where it adjoined the 1st Rangers.

According to the Australian official history, at 11:00 the 1st Rangers – possibly believing that the 2/8th was retreating – began to withdraw. This opened the pass itself to the Germans, created a gap between the 2/4th and 2/8th Battalions, severed communications between Vasey and the 2/8th and left Australian anti-tank guns without infantry protection. To the west of the battlefield, the Greek 21st Infantry Brigade reported at 12:00 that it had lost contact with the Australian 2/4 Battalion. At 13:00, the Dodecanese Regiment reported that the Australians of the 2/8th Battalion were retreating, although the Regiment itself had taken no such order yet. The two companies of the 2/8th Battalion on the western flank (Coombes' and Robertson's), were forced to retreat up the slopes.

However, in the words of Australian official historian Gavin Long: "At 2:00 pm ... Lt.-Col. [John] Mitchell of the 2/8th ... ordered a counter-attack which regained some vital ground on top of the ridge... After six hours of intermittent fighting in the pass and on the slopes to the east, the 2/8th still held the Hills though their left had been mauled; the Rangers, however, were rallying astride the road about two miles to the rear, but five of the six supporting guns of the 2/1st Anti-Tank Regiment had been left without protection and abandoned. Thus the ridge held by the 2/8th formed a deep salient."

According to Long, Vasey was informed of the Rangers' withdrawal by officers from other units, but refused to believe it. The Dodecanese line began taking artillery fire at 14:30, concentrated mostly on Delinski Dol. In the west, the Greek 21st Brigade reported from 14:30 that groups of Australians were retreating south towards Xino Nero.

From 14:35 a number of assault guns and Panzerjäger vehicles had arrived to support the 1st and 7th companies of KG Witt.

Following the earlier German successes, the 2nd Company of LSSAH and a heavy machine gun platoon attacked west of the road, with the 3rd Company astride and left (east) of the road, the 7th Company attacking from Hill 917 to the west of Klidi village and the 1st Company from Hill 997 to the east of Klidi village. By 15:30, the 2nd and 3rd Companies had captured Hill 1009 in the 1st Rangers' sector, reducing British machine gun positions with heavy weapons. At 16:00 the forces fighting against KG Witt began to retreat and carried out demolitions on the road. KG Witt attacked forward, and pioneers coming behind the 3rd company started to open a corridor in the Allied minefield eventually allowing two assault guns (StuG) to pass through. Simultaneously, III/LSSAH and Vorausabteilung Apell began their attacks.

=== The Allied escape movement ===
With German artillery fire on the Greek lines becoming more intense, at 15:40, Mackay ordered the Dodecanese Regiment to retreat immediately and to have completed the evacuation of its positions by 18:00 (bringing forward the withdrawal scheduled for 19:00). At 16:30, the Regiment began its withdrawal, after destroying its artillery pieces which could not be evacuated. When the Regiment began its retreat, it reported that no British Empire forces were to be seen in the Kirli Derven sector. According to German sources, III/LSSAH began its attack toward Kelli at 16:20.

In the west at 16:00, the German attack was extended against the Greek 1/88th Battalion, which began taking artillery and mortar fire. Between 16:30 and 18:00, a force reported by the Greeks as elements of the German vanguard – primarily the 9th Reconnaissance Battalion and the I/11 SchützenBattalion – concentrated against the battalion's sector (Radosi Hill), and came to assaulting distance, under harassing fire from the Greeks.

The 2/8th had been exposed on two flanks by the Greek and British withdrawals; it was soon coming under German machine gun fire from the east. According to an official Australian account, Vasey "realised his men were not going to be able to stage an orderly withdrawal. At 17:00, he telephoned the commanding officer of the 2/4th Battalion ... with the code phrase indicating that a pull-out was now vital – "the roof is leaking."

At 17:30, the Australian official history reported that 500 German infantry supported by self-propelled guns attacked in force along the width of the 2/8th's sector. A German participant of the battle, Obersturmbannfuhrer Kurt Meyer, wrote later of his surprise at how easily the heavy StuGs had climbed the slopes. "We watched the guns advance in amazement. They climbed higher and higher, and then joined the fight. Nobody [had] thought it possible to use them, but now they were up there, giving valuable support to the infantry. Completely shaken by the impression German shelling had made on them, British [sic] prisoners came down the mountain. They were tall, strong fellows and formidable opponents." The self-propelled guns effectively sealed the Allies' defeat at Vevi. The 2/8th Battalion was forced into a chaotic retreat, with component units being separated and officers ordering the abandonment even of light weapons, to speed the withdrawal. Losses among the Australian infantry would have been much worse it were not for the 2/1st Anti-Tank Regiment and the British Royal Horse Artillery standing their ground in the centre, until the Germans were only 400 metres (440 yards) away.

According to German sources at 18:00 the 7th and 1st Companies of LSSAH captured the village of Klidi, having taken 82 prisoners. A little later the 3rd company captured the exit of the rail tunnel taking another 250 New Zealand, British and Australian prisoners. Both Greek and German sources agree that III/LSSAH was in Kelli at 18:15 and subsequently occupied vacant Greek positions, also reaching Petra by 20:15. However, German sources report that Greek units were still fighting to the far east at 20:00, when 40 Greek and 60 Australian prisoners were taken.

=== Allied defeat ===
The early collapse of the British Empire's lines in the Klidi Pass, allowed German forces to advance south of the pass before the Dodecanese Regiment had completed its withdrawal to the west. Its right column (consisting of the III and I battalions, as well as the regimental HQ company) was attacked by "about 20 German tanks" (actually six StuG and nine PzJg I) at 18:00 west of Amyntaion, with fire from a distance of 800–1,000 m (870–1,090 yd). The column was saved by the timely intervention of 25–30 British tanks that prevented their capture.

In the west, the positions of the Greek 88th Regiment were assaulted at 18:30. After a brief uneven clash at close quarters, the Germans overran the 88th, which reeled back toward Aetos. According to Greek sources, an attempted counterattack was aborted when the 88th Regiment's commander was killed; however, German sources mention repulsing a Greek attack against the German right flank at 19:00 (which conforms to the actual disposition of forces, with the Greek regimental HQ south-west of the German attack).

Meanwhile, to the east, at 19:00 the 12th and 13th companies of III/LSSAH marched over Hill 1202 (presumably Delinski Dol, noted in Greek maps as Hill 1200), to the east, while the 14th company west of Lake Petron to the village of Petres. The 2nd company attacked astride the road followed closely by the 3rd company, while the 1st and 7th came down from the Hills flanking the pass toward Sotir. At 21:00 operations stopped at a line extending from the east of Xino Nero almost to Sotir.

At 20:00, the remnants of the Greek 88th Regiment had started to arrive at Aetos. It had suffered 11 killed, 18 wounded (including its commander) and 96 captured (some of them wounded). The regiment began to reorganise, although its numbers were only sufficient to form one company. German casualties were reported by the Greeks as "heavy".

German sources also report that elements of the Vorausabteilung Appell captured Hill 966 (Seveskeravi Hill) at 22:30 after hard fighting against Australians. However, the hill belonged to the Greek sector and is not mentioned in the Australian or Greek official histories.

== Aftermath ==
The 2/8th Battalion was effectively destroyed as a fighting force for the rest of the Greek campaign. According to some accounts, at its fallback position of Rodona, the battalion could muster only 250 men, of whom only 50 had weapons. Although the 2/4th Battalion had been spared the brunt of the German assault at Vevi, it had 70 personnel taken prisoner at a German roadblock during its retreat to Sotir. The Germans claimed 480 "English" prisoners at Vevi for the loss of 37 dead, 95 wounded and two taken prisoner. For Witt, the victory was perhaps overshadowed by the death of his brother, also a member of LSSAH, whose vehicle drove over a mine during the battle. Gerhard Pleiss – a platoon commander whose men captured the highest point – was subsequently awarded the Knight's Cross of the Iron Cross, the highest German award for bravery on the battlefield. A further 14 members of KGW received the Iron Cross First Class.

Although it was defeated and suffered heavy losses, Mackay Force's actions at Vevi gained two days for the retreat and regrouping of Allied forces to the south. Despite this, by the time the Allied resistance at Klidi collapsed, the Greek 20th and 12th Divisions had yet to complete their withdrawal, and subsequently found themselves defending their resistance positions on the Mount Siniatsiko line (passes of Kleisoura, Vlasti and Siatista) in very disadvantageous terms. The Dodecanese Regiment, the most combat-worthy of the 20th Division's units, was scattered during the westward withdrawal, due to misunderstandings with the British who undertook their transport on lorries as the regiment’s commander chose not to show up at the scheduled rendezvous with Battalion I and III, and remained as the reserve of the 20th Division for the remainder of the war. The bulk of the 20th Division was still straggling westward towards Mt. Siniatsiko when the German LSSAH brigade made contact with the main defensive line at Kleisoura in the evening on 13 April.

The 12th Division, retreating through snowstorms over Mount Vermion, was still east of the Florina-Servia road when Mackay Force retreated from Klidi. Although the British 1st Armoured Brigade fought delaying battles at Sotir and Proastio during 13 April, covering 12th Division's withdrawal, the latter was eventually split by the German advance, losing three of its battalions which were cut off the main body and retreated south towards Servia. When the German 9th Panzer Division made contact with the Siatista defensive location at 13.30 on 14 April, only one battalion of the 82nd Regiment was in position. When expecting the German assault on Siatista pass on 15 April, 12th Division could muster only 1,000 men as an effective strength; it was greatly demoralised and fatigued.

== See also ==
- Operation Marita (German plan for the invasion of Greece.)
- Battle of Kleisoura Pass, next battle after Battle of Vevi.
