= William Cremor =

Australian Army officer

William Edward Cremor
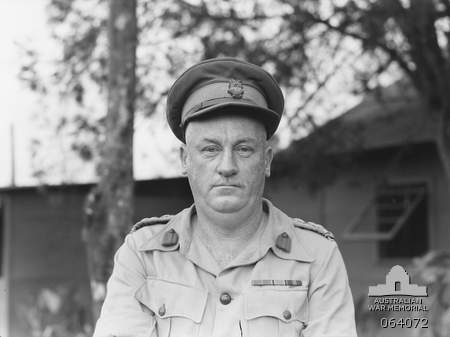
- Brigadier William Cremor in February 1944
- Born: 12 December 1897; Sandringham, Victoria
- Died: 11 April 1962 (aged 64); Heidelberg, Victoria
- Military career
- Allegiance: Australia
- Branch: Australian Army
- Service years: 1917–1945
- Rank: Brigadier
- Service number: VX86
- Unit: 3rd Field Artillery Brigade (1918)
- Commands: Royal Artillery, II Corps (1944–45); Royal Artillery, I Corps (1943–44); 6th Divisional Artillery (1943); 3rd Divisional Artillery (1942–43); 2/2nd Field Artillery Regiment (1940–42); 10th Field Artillery Brigade (1936–39)
- Conflicts: First World War; Western Front; Second World War; Western Desert Campaign; Battle of Greece; Battle of Crete; New Guinea campaign
- Awards: Commander of the Order of the British Empire; Efficiency Decoration
- Other work: Educationist

Brigadier William Edward Cremor, CBE, ED (12 December 1897 – 11 April 1962) was an Australian Army officer and school teacher. He served during the First and Second World Wars, commanding a number of artillery units.

== Early life ==
Cremor was born on 12 December 1897 at Sandringham in Melbourne to railway porter William Edward Cremor and Jane, née Phelan. His early education took place at Footscray State School up to 1911 when he began at St. Joseph's CBC North Melbourne, later St. Joseph's College Melbourne. During his first year there, he achieved Dux of class and in subsequent years earned distinctions in Algebra, French and History. Early in 1914 he completed his examination to become a clerk in the Victorian Public Service and in 1915 was transferred to the Commonwealth Department of Trade and Customs.

== Military career ==
On 11 December 1917, Cremor enlisted in the Australian Imperial Force (AIF) and served briefly in France in late 1918 with the 3rd Field Artillery Brigade. He was discharged from the AIF on 8 November 1919 and obtained a commission in the Militia in November 1920. He studied at the University of Melbourne, from which he would eventually receive a Bachelor of Arts in 1945.

=== Interwar period ===
In 1923, Cremor began working as an English teacher at Footscray Technical School, and in 1927 became secretary of the Victorian Teachers' Union, rising to president in 1930. He resigned from the union in 1934 and was appointed secretary of the Victorian Dried Fruits Board. He continued serving with the Militia and was promoted lieutenant colonel on 1 May 1936, with command of the 10th Field Brigade of the Royal Australian Artillery.

=== Second World War ===
In October 1939, Cremor rejoined the AIF and commanded the 2/2nd Field Artillery Regiment in the Middle East from April 1940. He was appointed Officer of the Order of the British Empire in 1941 for his service in the Western Desert Campaign. His regiment served in Greece and Crete from March to May 1941. During the latter stages of the Battle of Crete, Cremor was placed in command of an amalgamation of units, including his own, which was designated Cremor Force. His command was effectively fighting as infantry. Following the battle, he and his men embarked for Egypt. He returned to Australia in August 1942, where he was given command of the 3rd Division's artillery units and promoted temporary brigadier. He contested the seat of Fawkner at the 1943 federal election as an independent candidate, advocating a unified army. He would win 22% of the vote.

Cremor then served in the South West Pacific Area as commander of the Royal Australian Artillery, I Corps from October 1943 to May 1944, followed by a six-month period in command of the Royal Australian Artillery, New Guinea Force. He then held the equivalent post in II Corps from October 1944 to April 1945. On 12 April he was transferred to the Reserve of Officers and appointed Commander of the Order of the British Empire for his services in the South-West Pacific.

== Later life ==
In 1945, Cremor became the University of Melbourne's guidance officer for ex-service students, and wrote a regular column in The Argus. In 1949 he was appointed to the Teachers' Tribunal as government representative, and he edited the history of his regiment, Action Front, in 1961.

Cremor died at Heidelberg in 1962 and was cremated.
