= 2/1st Anti-Tank Regiment (Australia) =

Australian Army anti-tank regiment

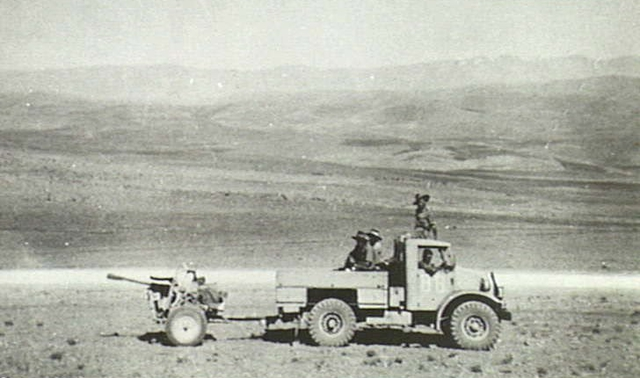
- Gun crew from the 2/1st in northern Syria, December 1941
- Active: 1939–1945
- Country: Australia
- Branch: Australian Army
- Type: Royal Australian Artillery
- Role: Tank attack
- Part of: 6th Division
- Engagements: World War II: Battle of Greece; Syria–Lebanon campaign; Aitape–Wewak campaign

Insignia
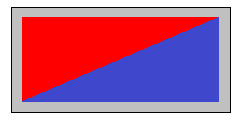
- Unit colour patch

The 2/1st Anti-Tank Regiment was an Australian Army anti-tank artillery regiment that was raised for service during the Second World War as part of the all volunteer Second Australian Imperial Force. Formed in November 1939, it was sent to the United Kingdom in mid-1940, but was broken up and converted into infantry. In late 1940, the regiment was re-formed and deployed to the Middle East, joining the 6th Division. It took part in the Battle of Greece before being evacuated to Egypt. Later, the regiment took part in the Syria–Lebanon campaign. In early 1942, it was withdrawn back to Australia for service in the Pacific. En route the regiment was diverted to Ceylon for garrison duties. It served in New Guinea around Port Moresby and Milne Bay in 1942–1943 and then again in early 1945 during the Aitape–Wewak campaign, serving there until the end of the war.

== History ==
=== Formation ===
The regiment was formed in the early part of the war, as part of the all-volunteer Second Australian Imperial Force (2nd AIF) that was raised for overseas service during World War II. The regiment was initially formed in November 1939 in Queensland and Tasmania as the corps-assigned 2/5th Army Field Regiment; this unit was then redesignated as the 2/5th Anti-Tank Regiment in January 1940, and then renamed again to the 2/1st Anti-Tank Regiment the following month. This process was completed in March, by which time the regiment consisted of four batteries. Authorised to receive forty-eight 2-pounder guns, the regiment had an official establishment of 556 men, including 30 officers.

Initially assigned to the 6th Division, the regiment was dispatched to the Middle East, departing Sydney on 4 May as part of the third convoy carrying troops from the Second AIF. En route, the war situation in Europe grew worse for the Allies as the Germans invaded France. As a result, the convoy carrying the regiment was diverted to the United Kingdom. They arrived in Scotland on 17 June. Arriving without guns, amidst concerns of a possible invasion falling the Fall of France, the regiment was broken up and its headquarters was converted into an infantry unit as part of the 25th Infantry Brigade. This unit was initially called the 70th Infantry Battalion, but was later re-designated as the 2/31st Infantry Battalion. The regiment's two batteries – the 1st and 2nd Anti-Tank Batteries – remained, though, as independent sub-units assigned to the 18th and 25th Infantry Brigades.

In September 1940, the regiment was re-raised under the command of Lieutenant Colonel Frances St John in preparation for its transfer to the Middle East where the AIF was preparing to go into combat for the first time during the war. Consisting of the 1st, 2nd, 3rd, and 4th Batteries, the regiment was established at Tidworth, before moving to Colchester. It began embarking in October and November from Liverpool, by which time it was almost at full strength and had received most of its guns and equipment.

=== Middle East and Greece ===
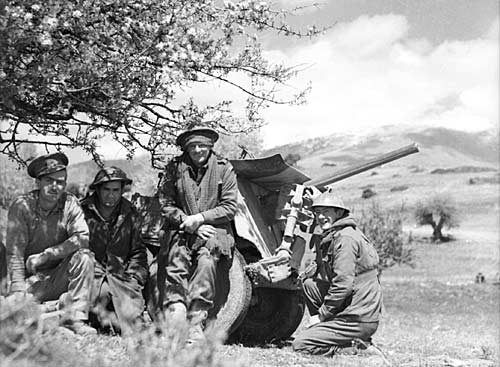
Gunners from the 2/1st after withdrawal from Vevi

Arriving in the Middle East, the regiment rejoined the 6th Division at Ikingi Maryut in Egypt; however, it was not ready to join the division's first combat actions around Benghazi in January 1941 and it remained behind at Amiriya at this time. In early April, the regiment was deployed to Greece, along with the rest of the 6th Division in anticipation of a German invasion.

Following the opening of the campaign, the regiment deployed one battery in support of the 16th Infantry Brigade around the Veria Pass, while the remaining batteries were assigned to Mackay Force, supporting the 19th Infantry Brigade at Vevi, where they were defend against a thrust through Yugoslavia through the Florina Valley. On 11–12 April, three batteries from the regiment took part in the Battle of Vevi. Positioned close to the infantry in the forward positions, the regiment’s guns were positioned on the forward slopes so that they could fire down the road from Vevi. In the early stages of the battle, mobile German guns inflicted casualties on the anti-tank gunners who were exposed on the forward slopes, and after the arrival of a large column of German troops heavy fighting followed. By the final stages, the gunners were engaging the advancing German infantrymen over open sights before withdrawing by battery. Due to its dispositions, the regiment lost 16 guns and 79 men captured. After falling back towards Servia, the regiment’s batteries became separated as they were hastily tasked with supporting Australian and New Zealand rearguard actions around Kalabaka, Bralos Pass and Erithrai while the Allied forces withdrew steadily. During this period, the regiment's 2-pounders proved ineffective against the German armour, although they had some success firing at the tracks. As the withdrawal continued, the decision was made to evacuate from several locations including Athens and Kalamata. The regiment's losses during the campaign amounted to 18 killed and 16 wounded, in addition those captured at Vevi.

The main body was evacuated by sea back to Palestine, although some personnel from the regiment also landed on Crete where they took part in the unsuccessful defence of the island during the Battle of Crete. Meanwhile, the regiment was re-formed in May at Khassa. The respite was only brief, though, as in June the 4th Battery was detached for service with Habforce during the Syria–Lebanon campaign, supporting the British advance from Iraq into Syria, during which the battery lost two men killed and nine wounded. Meanwhile, in mid-July the remaining elements of the 2/1st were assigned to support the British 6th Infantry Division in the final stages of the campaign. After the armistice was signed by Vichy French forces, the regiment remained in Syria as occupation troops, serving around Baalbek until November 1941 when they were returned to the Australian 6th Division at Beit Jitra, before returning to Syria in December as the Australians took over responsibility for the occupation.

Japan's entry into the war in December 1941, resulted in a request for Australian troops to return from the Middle East. As a result, in February 1942 the 2/1st Anti-Tank Regiment returned from Syria, embarking from Egypt in March. En route, part of the 6th Division was diverted to Ceylon, where it was believed a Japanese invasion might be imminent. While deployed to Ceylon, the regiment undertook defensive duties and deployed a battery to Honara with the 16th Infantry Brigade and to Akuressa with the 17th Infantry Brigade. They remained on the island until July.

=== Pacific war ===
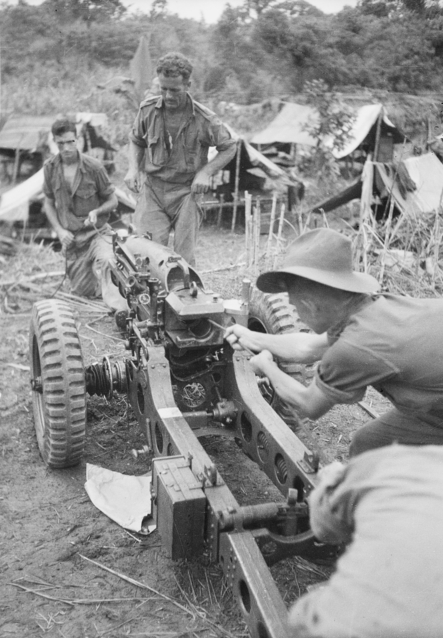
A 75 mm gun operated by the regiment at Kiarivu, New Guinea, August 1945

Arriving in Australia in August, a period of leave followed before the regiment was reconstituted at Greta, New South Wales. By August – September, the situation in the New Guinea campaign was critical for the Australians, as the Japanese were advancing along the Kokoda Track towards Port Moresby; as a result, the newly returned 16th Brigade was hastily deployed to reinforce the Australian troops on the track, and the 1st Battery deployed in support. The 16th subsequently took part in the Australian counter offensive that pushed the Japanese back towards their beachheads on the northern coast in October and November. Meanwhile, regimental headquarters was deployed to Port Moresby in November, and the 3rd Battery deployed to Milne Bay. The 2nd Battery remained at Greta, though, and the 4th Battery was subsequently disbanded at this time. To make up for its missing battery, the 8th Battery was temporarily attached to the regiment from the 2/2nd Anti-Tank Regiment, in Port Moresby at this time.

During the Battle of Buna–Gona, the 2/1st Anti-Tank Regiment detached a 6-pounder from Port Moresby to reinforce elements of the 2/1st Field Regiment. This gun fired directly onto Japanese bunkers around Sanananda, which was subsequently secured by 22 January 1943. Meanwhile, in February 1943 the 3rd Battery rejoined the regiment from Milne Bay, and the 8th Battery returned to the 2/2nd. The following month, the regiment was renamed the 2/1st Tank Attack Regiment.

The regiment remained in New Guinea until October 1943, returning by sea to Cairns, Queensland. Throughout late 1943 and into 1944, the regiment remained in Australia as there was no real role for them in the offensives being fought by the Australians in New Guinea at this time to secure Salamaua–Lae, the Huon Peninsula and the Finisterre Ranges. Instead, they undertook training on the Atherton Tablelands, and for a period, the regiment detached one of its batteries to the School of Artillery at Holsworthy, New South Wales. Ultimately, the regiment did not see action until the final year of the war. In late 1944, the Australian Army assumed responsibility for securing the area around Aitape and Wewak in northern New Guinea, taking over from US troops who were redirected to the Philippines. The regiment deployed to Aitape in January 1945 to join the Aitape–Wewak campaign, under the command of Lieutenant Colonel Arthur Rickard,

Due to the tactical situation, the regiment was not employed in an anti-tank role during its final campaign. Instead, it operated several different types of artillery pieces in addition to the typical anti-tank guns; this included several 75 mm pack howitzer mountain guns. These were operated by one of the regiment's batteries, while another of the batteries also received 4.2-inch mortars. Further diversification in roles occurred when one of the regiment's batteries was re-trained as infantry and deployed to secure rear areas, including an airfield that was established in the mountains. During the final action to secure Wewak, the regiment's pack howitzers supported commandos assigned to Farida Force during an amphibious landing that was carried out around Dove Bay, to the east of Wewak. Losses during the Aitape–Wewak campaign amounted to 33 killed or wounded.

The Australian War Memorial lists 28 members of the regiment on the Roll of Honour as having lost their lives during the war. Twelve members were decorated as a result of their service in the regiment.
